This is a list of the Japanese species of the superfamily Noctuoidea. It also acts as an index to the species articles and forms part of the full List of moths of Japan.

Notodontidae
 フサオシャチホコ  — Dudusa sphingiformis Moore, 1872
 ギンモンスズメモドキ  — Tarsolepis japonica japonica Wileman & South, 1917
 トガリバシャチホコ  — Phycidopsis albovittata Hampson, 1893
 ナントシャチホコ  — Stauropus alternus (Walker, 1855)
 ヒメシャチホコ  — Stauropus basalis basalis (Moore, 1877)
 シャチホコガ  — Stauropus fagi persimilis Butler, 1879
 ゴマダラシャチホコ  — Stauropus obliteratus (Wileman & South, 1917)
 テイキチシャチホコ  — Stauropus teikichianus Matsumura, 1929
 アマミアオシャチホコ  — Syntypistis amamiensis (Nakatomi, 1981)
 オオアオシャチホコ伊豆諸島以外亜種  — Syntypistis cyanea cyanea (Leech, [1889])
 オオアオシャチホコ伊豆諸島亜種  — Syntypistis cyanea izuensis (Nakamura & Kishida, 1977)
 アオシャチホコ  — Syntypistis japonica (Nakatomi, 1981)
 ナチアオシャチホコ  — Syntypistis nachiensis (Marumo, 1920)
 プライヤアオシャチホコ  — Syntypistis pryeri (Leech, 1899)
 ブナアオシャチホコ  — Syntypistis punctatella (Motschulsky, [1861])
 ホリシャシャチホコ  — Syntypistis subgeneris (Strand, 1915)
 イリオモテアオシャチホコ  — Vaneeckeia pallidifascia iriomotensis Nakatomi, 1980
 バイバラシロシャチホコ  — Cnethodonta grisescens grisescens Staudinger, 1887
 シロシャチホコ  — Cnethodonta japonica Sugi, 1980
 ニッコウシャチホコ  — Shachia circumscripta (Butler, 1885)
 モクメシャチホコ  — Cerura felina Butler, 1877
 オオモクメシャチホコ  — Cerura menciana Moore, 1877
 タッタカモクメシャチホコ  — Paracerura tattakana (Matsumura, 1927)
 ホシナカグロモクメシャチホコ  — Furcula bicuspis (Borkhausen, 1790)
 ナカグロモクメシャチホコ  — Furcula furcula sangaica (Moore, 1877)
 ツシマクロモンシャチホコ  — Harpyia tokui (Sugi, 1977)
 ギンシャチホコ  — Harpyia umbrosa (Staudinger, 1892)
 ネウスシャチホコ  — Chadisra bipartita (Matsumura, 1925)
 モンクロギンシャチホコ  — Wilemanus bidentatus bidentatus (Wileman, 1911)
 ムラサキシャチホコ  — Uropyia meticulodina (Oberthür, 1884)
 ホソバシャチホコ  — Fentonia ocypete (Bremer, 1861)
 クロシタシャチホコ  — Mesophalera sigmata (Butler, 1877)
 ワイルマンネグロシャチホコ  — Disparia nigrofasciata (Wileman, 1910)
 ホソバネグロシャチホコ  — Disparia variegata sordida (Wileman, 1911)
 ヤクシマネグロシャチホコ  — Neodrymonia acuminata (Matsumura, 1929)
 チョウセンネグロシャチホコ  — Neodrymonia coreana Matsumura, 1922
 フタジマネグロシャチホコ  — Neodrymonia delia (Leech, [1889])
 ハイイロネグロシャチホコ  — Neodrymonia marginata (Matsumura, 1925)
 オオネグロシャチホコ  — Eufentonia nihonica (Wileman, 1911)
 ムクツマキシャチホコ  — Phalera angustipennis Matsumura, 1919
 ツマキシャチホコ  — Phalera assimilis (Bremer & Grey, 1853)
 モンクロシャチホコ  — Phalera flavescens (Bremer & Grey, 1853)
 クロツマキシャチホコ  — Phalera minor Nagano, 1916
 タカサゴツマキシャチホコ  — Phalera takasagoensis Matsumura, 1919
 ユミモンシャチホコ  — Ellida arcuata (Alphéraky, 1897)
 クロテンシャチホコ  — Ellida branickii (Oberthür, 1880)
 シロテンシャチホコ  — Ellida viridimixta (Bremer, 1861)
 ナカスジシャチホコ  — Nerice bipartita Butler, 1885
 シロスジシャチホコ  — Nerice davidi Oberthür, 1881
 アカシャチホコ  — Gangaridopsis citrina (Wileman, 1911)
 カバイロモクメシャチホコ  — Hupodonta corticalis Butler, 1877
 スジモクメシャチホコ  — Hupodonta lignea Matsumura, 1919
 ヘリスジシャチホコ  — Neopheosia fasciata japonica Okano, 1955
 アオバシャチホコ  — Zaranga permagna (Butler, 1881)
 クビワシャチホコ  — Shaka atrovittatus (Bremer, 1861)
 クロスジシャチホコ  — Lophocosma sarantuja Schintlmeister & Kinoshita, 1984
 セダカシャチホコ  — Rabtala cristata (Butler, 1877)
 アオセダカシャチホコ  — Rabtala splendida (Oberthür, 1880)
 トリゲキシャチホコ  — Torigea plumosa (Leech, [1889])
 キシャチホコ  — Torigea straminea (Moore, 1877)
 ウスキシャチホコ  — Mimopydna pallida (Butler, 1877)
 カバイロシャチホコ  — Ramesa tosta Walker, 1855
 トビネシャチホコ  — Nephodonta tsushimensis Sugi, 1980
 シロジマシャチホコ  — Pheosia rimosa fusiformis Matsumura, 1921
 マエジロシャチホコ  — Notodonta albicosta (Matsumura, 1920)
 ウチキシャチホコ  — Notodonta dembowskii Oberthür, 1879
 トビスジシャチホコ  — Notodonta stigmatica Matsumura, 1920
 トビマダラシャチホコ  — Notodonta torva sugitanii Matsumura, 1924
 ニトベシャチホコ  — Peridea aliena (Staudinger, 1892)
 シノノメシャチホコ  — Peridea elzet Kiriakoff, 1963
 ナカキシャチホコ  — Peridea gigantea Butler, 1877
 イシダシャチホコ  — Peridea graeseri (Staudinger, 1892)
 アカネシャチホコ  — Peridea lativitta (Wileman, 1911)
 ルリモンシャチホコ  — Peridea oberthueri (Staudinger, 1892)
 マルモンシャチホコ  — Peridea rotundata (Matsumura, 1920)
 ネスジシャチホコ  — Fusadonta basilinea (Wileman, 1911)
 スズキシャチホコ  — Pheosiopsis cinerea (Butler, 1879)
 ウグイスシャチホコ  — Pheosiopsis olivacea (Matsumura, 1920)
 アマギシャチホコ  — Eriodonta amagisana (Marumo, 1933)
 ノヒラトビモンシャチホコ  — Drymonia basalis Wileman & South, 1917
 トビモンシャチホコ  — Drymonia dodonides (Staudinger, 1887)
 コトビモンシャチホコ  — Drymonia japonica (Wileman, 1911)
 モンキシロシャチホコ  — Leucodonta bicoloria ([Denis & Schiffermüller], 1775)
 カエデシャチホコ  — Semidonta biloba (Oberthür, 1880)
 ハイイロシャチホコ  — Microphalera grisea Butler, 1885
 ヤスジシャチホコ  — Epodonta lineata (Oberthür, 1880)
 オオトビモンシャチホコ屋久島以北亜種  — Phalerodonta manleyi manleyi (Leech, [1889])
 オオトビモンシャチホコ琉球亜種  — Phalerodonta manleyi yambaru Kishida, 1995
 ミナミノクロシャチホコ  — Hiradonta ohashii Nakatomi, 2000
 タカオシャチホコ  — Hiradonta takaonis Matsumura, 1924
 ツマジロシャチホコ  — Hexafrenum leucodera (Staudinger, 1892)
 タカムクシャチホコ  — Takadonta takamukui Matsumura, 1920
 ウスグロシャチホコ  — Epinotodonta fumosa Matsumura, 1919
 ハガタエグリシャチホコ  — Hagapteryx admirabilis (Staudinger, 1887)
 ゲンカイハガタシャチホコ  — Hagapteryx kishidai Nakamura, 1978
 スジエグリシャチホコ  — Ptilodon hoegei (Graeser, 1888)
 エゾエグリシャチホコ  — Ptilodon jezoensis (Matsumura, 1919)
 クワヤマエグリシャチホコ  — Ptilodon kuwayamae (Matsumura, 1919)
 クロエグリシャチホコ  — Ptilodon okanoi (Inoue, 1958)
 エグリシャチホコ  — Ptilodon robustus (Matsumura, 1924)
 シロスジエグリシャチホコ  — Fusapteryx ladislai (Oberthür, 1880)
 ウスヅマシャチホコ  — Lophontosia cuculus (Staudinger, 1887)
 プライヤエグリシャチホコ  — Lophontosia pryeri (Butler, 1879)
 コクシエグリシャチホコ  — Odontosia marumoi Inoue, 1955
 シーベルスシャチホコ  — Odontosia sieversii japonibia Matsumura, 1929
 ホッカイエグリシャチホコ  — Odontosia walakui Kobayashi, 2006
 エゾクシヒゲシャチホコ  — Ptilophora jezoensis (Matsumura, 1920)
 クシヒゲシャチホコ  — Ptilophora nohirae (Matsumura, 1920)
 キエグリシャチホコ  — Himeropteryx miraculosa Staudinger, 1887
 タテスジシャチホコ  — Togepteryx velutina (Oberthür, 1880)
 ハネブサシャチホコ  — Platychasma virgo Butler, 1881
 ギンモンシャチホコ  — Spatalia dives Oberthür, 1884
 ウスイロギンモンシャチホコ  — Spatalia doerriesi Graeser, 1888
 エゾギンモンシャチホコ  — Spatalia jezoensis Wileman & South, 1916
 オオエグリシャチホコ  — Pterostoma gigantinum Staudinger, 1892
 チョウセンエグリシャチホコ  — Pterostoma griseum (Bremer, 1861)
 ギンボシシャチホコ  — Rosama cinnamomea Leech, 1888
 トビギンボシシャチホコ  — Rosama ornata (Oberthür, 1884)
 クワゴモドキシャチホコ  — Gonoclostera timoniorum (Bremer, 1861)
 ヒナシャチホコ  — Micromelalopha troglodyta (Graeser, 1890)
 コフタオビシャチホコ  — Gluphisia crenata crenata (Esper, 1785)
 ニセツマアカシャチホコ  — Clostera albosigma curtuloides Erschoff, 1870
 ツマアカシャチホコ  — Clostera anachoreta ([Denis & Schiffermüller], 1775)
 セグロシャチホコ  — Clostera anastomosis (Linnaeus, 1758)

Lymantriidae
 スギドクガ  — Calliteara argentata (Butler, 1881)
 スズキドクガ  — Calliteara conjuncta (Wileman, 1911)
 アカヒゲドクガ  — Calliteara lunulata (Butler, 1877)
 リンゴドクガ  — Calliteara pseudabietis Butler, 1885
 シタキドクガ  — Calliteara taiwana aurifera (Scriba, 1919)
 ウスジロドクガ  — Calliteara virginea (Oberthür, 1879)
 マメドクガ  — Cifuna locuples confusa (Bremer, 1861)
 ブドウドクガ  — Ilema eurydice (Butler, 1880)
 ナチキシタドクガ  — Ilema nachiensis (Marumo, 1917)
 ダイセツドクガ  — Gynaephora rossii daisetsuzana (Matsumura, 1928)
 アカモンドクガ  — Telochurus recens approximans (Butler, 1881)
 コシロモンドクガ  — Orgyia postica (Walker, 1855)
 ヒメシロモンドクガ  — Orgyia thyellina Butler, 1881
 ヤクシマドクガ  — Orgyia triangularis Nomura, 1938
 スゲドクガ  — Laelia coenosa sangaica Moore, 1877
 スゲオオドクガ  — Laelia gigantea Butler, 1885
 クニガミスゲドクガ  — Laelia kunigamiensis Kishida, 1995
 ツシマシロドクガ  — Arctornis album (Bremer, 1861)
 ヒメシロドクガ  — Arctornis chichibense (Matsumura, 1921)
 ニワトコドクガ  — Arctornis jonasii (Butler, 1877)
 ヒメスカシドクガ  — Arctornis kanazawai Inoue, 1982
 スカシドクガ  — Arctornis kumatai Inoue, 1956
 エルモンドクガ  — Arctornis l-nigrum ussuricum Bytinski-Salz, 1939
 ブチヒゲヤナギドクガ  — Leucoma candida (Staudinger, 1892)
 ヤナギドクガ  — Leucoma salicis (Linnaeus, 1758)
 キアシドクガ  — Ivela auripes (Butler, 1877)
 ヒメキアシドクガ  — Ivela ochropoda (Eversmann, 1847)
 シロオビドクガ本土亜種  — Numenes albofascia albofascia (Leech, [1889])
 シロオビドクガ屋久島亜種  — Numenes albofascia yakushimana Nomura, 1938
 コシロオビドクガ  — Numenes disparilis Staudinger, 1887
 シロシタマイマイ  — Lymantria albescens Hori & Umeno, 1930
 バンタイマイマイ  — Lymantria bantaizana Matsumura, 1933
 マイマイガ  — Lymantria dispar japonica (Motschulsky, 1861)
 オキナワマイマイ  — Lymantria flavida Pogue & Schaefer, 2007
 ハラアカマイマイ  — Lymantria fumida Butler, 1877
 オオヤママイマイ  — Lymantria lucescens (Butler, 1881)
 カシワマイマイ  — Lymantria mathura aurora Butler, 1877
 ミノオマイマイ屋久島以北亜種  — Lymantria minomonis minomonis Matsumura, 1934
 ミノオマイマイ奄美以南亜種  — Lymantria minomonis okinawaensis Kishida, 1987
 ノンネマイマイ  — Lymantria monacha (Linnaeus, 1758)
 コシロシタマイマイ  — Lymantria postalba Inoue, 1956
 エゾマイマイ  — Lymantria umbrosa (Butler, 1881)
 マエグロマイマイ本土・対馬亜種  — Lymantria xylina nobunaga Nagano, 1912
 マエグロマイマイ屋久島以南亜種  — Lymantria xylina xylina Swinhoe, 1903
 ウチジロマイマイ  — Parocneria furva (Leech, [1889])
 クロモンドクガ  — Pida niphonis (Butler, 1881)
 チャドクガ  — Arna pseudoconspersa (Strand, 1914)
 オキナワドクガ  — Somena okinawana (Matsumura, 1921)
 ゴマフリドクガ  — Somena pulverea (Leech, [1889])
 タイワンキドクガ  — Orvasca taiwana (Shiraki, 1913)
 モンシロドクガ  — Sphrageidus similis (Fuessly, 1775)
 カンシキドクガ  — Artaxa kanshireia (Wileman, 1911)
 サカグチキドクガ  — Artaxa sakaguchii (Matsumura, 1927)
 ドクガ  — Artaxa subflava (Bremer, 1864)
 マガリキドクガ  — Nygmia curvata (Wileman, 1911)
 フタホシドクガ  — Nygmia staudingeri (Leech, [1889])
 キドクガ  — Euproctis piperita Oberthür, 1880
 トラサンドクガ  — Euproctis torasan (Holland, 1889)
 スキバドクガ  — Perina nuda (Fabricius, 1878)

Arctiidae
 ネズミホソバ  — Pelosia angusta (Staudinger, 1887)
 ホシホソバ  — Pelosia muscerda tetrasticta Hampson, 1900
 クロスジホソバ  — Pelosia noctis (Butler, 1881)
 ヒメクロスジホソバ  — Pelosia obtusa sutschana (Staudinger, 1892)
 クロミャクホソバ  — Pelosia ramosula (Staudinger, 1887)
 トカラホソバ  — Pelosia tokaraensis Kishida, 1993
 キシタホソバ  — Eilema aegrota (Butler, 1877)
 キムジホソバ  — Eilema affineola (Bremer, 1864)
 ヒメキマエホソバ  — Eilema coreana (Leech, [1889])
 ヒメキホソバ  — Eilema cribrata (Staudinger, 1887)
 シロホソバ  — Eilema degenerella (Walker, 1863)
 ムジホソバ  — Eilema deplana pavescens (Butler, 1877)
 シタクロホソバ  — Eilema flavociliata (Lederer, 1853)
 ヤネホソバ  — Eilema fuscodorsalis (Matsumura, 1930)
 ウスキシタホソバ  — Eilema griseola submontana Inoue, 1982
 キマエホソバ北海道亜種  — Eilema japonica ainonis (Matsumura, 1927)
 キマエホソバ本州以南亜種  — Eilema japonica japonica (Leech, [1889])
 ツマキホソバ  — Eilema laevis (Butler, 1877)
 ヒメツマキホソバ  — Eilema minor Okano, 1955
 ニセキマエホソバ  — Eilema nankingica (Daniel, 1954)
 ミヤマキベリホソバ  — Eilema okanoi Inoue, 1961
 アマミキホソバ  — Brunia antica (Walker, 1854)
 ナガサキムジホソバ  — Tigrioides immaculatus (Butler, 1880)
 リュウキュウムジホソバ  — Tigrioides pallens Inoue, 1980
 ルリモンホソバ  — Chrysaeglia magnifica taiwana Hampson, 1914
 キマエクロホソバ  — Ghoria collitoides Butler, 1885
 キベリネズミホソバ伊豆諸島亜種  — Ghoria gigantea flavipennis (Inoue & Maenami, 1963)
 キベリネズミホソバ伊豆諸島以外亜種  — Ghoria gigantea gigantea (Oberthür, 1879)
 マエグロホソバ  — Conilepia nigricosta (Leech, [1889])
 ヨツボシホソバ  — Lithosia quadra (Linnaeus, 1758)
 モンシロホソバ  — Vamuna alboluteora (Rothschild, 1912)
 クビワウスグロホソバ  — Macrobrochis staudingeri staudingeri (Alphéraky, 1897)
 ゴマフオオホソバ  — Agrisius fuliginosus japonicus Leech, [1889]
 アカスジシロコケガ伊豆諸島以外亜種  — Cyana hamata hamata (Walker, 1854)
 アカスジシロコケガ伊豆諸島亜種  — Cyana hamata maenamii (Inoue & Kobayashi, 1963)
 キスジシロコケガ  — Cyana harterti (Elwes, 1890)
 ヒトテンアカスジコケガ  — Cyana unipunctata (Elwes, 1890)
 ウスクロスジチビコケガ  — Stictane obscura (Inoue, 1976)
 クロスジチビコケガ  — Stictane rectilinea chinesica (Draudt, 1931)
 クロモンエグリホソバ  — Garudinia simulana (Walker, 1863)
 シロオビクロコケガ  — Siccia minuta (Butler, 1881)
 ウスグロコケガ  — Siccia obscura (Leech, [1889])
 バイバラホシコケガ  — Siccia sordida (Butler, 1877)
 ホシオビコケガ  — Aemene altaica (Lederer, 1855)
 クロテンシロコケガ  — Aemene fukudai (Inoue, 1965)
 オオベニヘリコケガ九州亜種  — Melanaema venata kyushuensis Inoue, 1982
 オオベニヘリコケガ四国亜種  — Melanaema venata shikokuensis Inoue, 1982
 オオベニヘリコケガ北海道・本州亜種  — Melanaema venata venata Butler, 1877
 クロスジコケガ  — Thumatha muscula (Staudinger, 1887)
 クシヒゲコケガ奄美以南亜種  — Thumatha ochracea bani (Kishida & Mano, 1997)
 クシヒゲコケガ屋久島以北亜種  — Thumatha ochracea ochracea (Bremer, 1861)
 ムモンウスキコケガ  — Neasura melanopyga (Hampson, 1918)
 ヤクシマコケガ  — Lyclene alikangiae intermedia (Marumo, 1923)
 ヒメホシキコケガ屋久島以北亜種  — Lyclene dharma butleri (Leech, [1889])
 ヒメホシキコケガ奄美以南亜種  — Lyclene dharma dharma (Moore, 1879)
 マエベニコケガ  — Nipponasura sanguinea Inoue, 1965
 チビコケガ  — Mithuna fuscivena Hampson, 1896
 フタホシキコケガ  — Nudina artaxidia (Butler, 1881)
 キベリチビコケガ  — Diduga flavicostata (Snellen, 1878)
 フタオビコケガ  — Eugoa basipuncta (Hampson, 1891)
 クロテンハイイロコケガ  — Eugoa grisea Butler, 1877
 ハガタベニコケガ本州・四国・九州・屋久島亜種  — Barsine aberrans aberrans (Butler, 1877)
 ハガタベニコケガ北海道亜種  — Barsine aberrans askoldensis (Oberthür, 1880)
 ハガタベニコケガ奄美以南亜種  — Barsine aberrans okinawana (Matsumura, 1930)
 サキシマベニコケガ  — Barsine expressa (Inoue, 1988)
 ゴマダラベニコケガ  — Barsine pulchra leacrita (Swinhoe, 1894)
 スジベニコケガ伊豆諸島亜種  — Barsine striata hachijoensis (Inoue & Maenami, 1963)
 スジベニコケガ伊豆諸島以外亜種  — Barsine striata striata (Bremer & Grey, 1853)
 ハガタキコケガ  — Miltochrista calamina Butler, 1877
 ベニヘリコケガ  — Miltochrista miniata rosaria Butler, 1877
 アマミハガタベニコケガ  — Miltochrista ziczac (Walker, 1856)
 スジマガリベニコケガ  — Asuridia carnipicta (Butler, 1877)
 ゴマダラキコケガ  — Stigmatophora leacrita (Swinhoe, 1894)
 モンクロベニコケガ  — Stigmatophora rhodophila (Walker, 1865)
 チャオビチビコケガ  — Philenora latifasciata Inoue & Kobayashi, 1963
 ウスバフタホシコケガ  — Schistophleps bipuncta Hampson, 1891
 スカシコケガ  — Nudaria ranruna Matsumura, 1927
 ウスバチビコケガ  — Nudaria unifascia (Inoue, 1980)
 ツマキカノコ  — Amata flava aritai Inoue, 1965
 カノコガ  — Amata fortunei fortunei (Orza, 1869)
 キハダカノコ  — Amata germana nigricauda (Miyake, 1907)
 ムラマツカノコ  — Syntomoides imaon (Cramer, 1779)
 リシリヒトリ  — Hyphoraia aulica rishiriensis Matsumura, 1927
 アマヒトリ北海道亜種  — Phragmatobia amurensis amurensis Seitz, 1910
 アマヒトリ本州以南亜種  — Phragmatobia amurensis japonica Rothschild, 1910
 フタスジヒトリ  — Spilarctia bifasciata Butler, 1881
 セスジヒトリ  — Spilarctia graminivora Inoue, 1988
 キバネモンヒトリ  — Spilarctia lutea japonica (Rothschild, 1910)
 フトスジモンヒトリ  — Spilarctia obliquizonata (Miyake, 1910)
 アトアカヒトリ  — Spilarctia postrubida (Wileman, 1910)
 スジモンヒトリ琉球亜種  — Spilarctia seriatopunctata azumai (Inoue, 1982)
 スジモンヒトリ奄美亜種  — Spilarctia seriatopunctata nuda (Inoue, 1976)
 スジモンヒトリ本土・対馬・屋久島亜種  — Spilarctia seriatopunctata seriatopunctata (Motschulsky, [1861])
 スジモンヒトリ伊豆諸島亜種  — Spilarctia seriatopunctata suzukii (Inoue & Maenami, 1963)
 オビヒトリ  — Spilarctia subcarnea (Walker, 1855)
 アカヒトリ  — Lemyra flammeola (Moore, 1877)
 クワゴマダラヒトリ  — Lemyra imparilis (Butler, 1877)
 カクモンヒトリ屋久島以北亜種  — Lemyra inaequalis inaequalis (Butler, 1879)
 カクモンヒトリ奄美以南亜種  — Lemyra inaequalis sakaguchii (Matsumura, 1930)
 クロバネヒトリ  — Lemyra infernalis (Butler, 1877)
 クロフシロヒトリ  — Eospilarctia lewisii (Butler, 1885)
 キハラゴマダラヒトリ  — Spilosoma lubricipedum sangaicum Walker, [1865]
 アカハラゴマダラヒトリ  — Spilosoma punctarium (Stoll, 1782)
 シロヒトリ  — Chionarctia nivea (Ménétriès, 1859)
 キバラヒトリ  — Epatolmis caesarea japonica (Walker, [1865])
 ゴマベニシタヒトリ  — Rhyparia purpurata gerda Warnecke, 1918
 ホシベニシタヒトリ  — Rhyparioides amurensis nipponensis Kishida & Inomata, 1981
 コベニシタヒトリ  — Rhyparioides metelkana flavida (Bremer, 1861)
 ベニシタヒトリ  — Rhyparioides nebulosa Butler, 1877
 ヒメベニシタヒトリ  — Rhyparioides subvaria (Walker, 1855)
 モンヘリアカヒトリ  — Diacrisia irene Butler, 1881
 アメリカシロヒトリ  — Hyphantria cunea (Drury, 1773)
 マエアカヒトリ  — Aloa lactinea (Cramer, 1777)
 クロスジヒトリ  — Creatonotos gangis (Linnaeus, 1763)
 ハイイロヒトリ  — Creatonotos transiens koni Miyake, 1909
 ダイセツヒトリ  — Grammia quenseli daisetsuzana (Matsumura, 1927)
 ヒメキシタヒトリ北海道亜種  — Parasemia plantaginis jezoensis Inoue, 1976
 ヒメキシタヒトリ上信山地亜種  — Parasemia plantaginis macromera (Butler, 1881)
 ヒメキシタヒトリ赤石山脈亜種  — Parasemia plantaginis melanissima Inoue, 1976
 ヒメキシタヒトリ飛騨山脈亜種  — Parasemia plantaginis melanomera (Butler, 1881)
 ジョウザンヒトリ  — Pericallia matronula helena Dubatolov & Kishida, 2004
 ヒトリガ  — Arctia caja phaeosoma (Butler, 1877)
 トラフヒトリ  — Aglaomorpha histrio histrio (Walker, 1855)
 トラガモドキ  — Nikaea matsumurai Kishida, 1983
 タイワンベニゴマダラヒトリ  — Utetheisa lotrix lotrix (Cramer, 1777)
 ベニゴマダラヒトリ小笠原ほか亜種  — Utetheisa pulchelloides umata Jordan, 1939
 ベニゴマダラヒトリ小笠原以外亜種  — Utetheisa pulchelloides vaga Jordan, 1939
 モンシロモドキ  — Nyctemera adversata (Schaller, 1788)
 デバリモンシロモドキ  — Nyctemera carissima (Swinhoe, 1908)
 キハラモンシロモドキ  — Nyctemera cenis (Cramer, 1777)
 ネッタイモンシロモドキ  — Nyctemera coleta coleta (Stoll, 1781)
 ツマキモンシロモドキ  — Nyctemera lacticinia (Cramer, 1777)
 オキナワモンシロモドキ  — Pitasila okinawensis (Inoue, 1982)
 キゴマダラヒトリ  — Argina astrea (Drury, 1773)

Nolidae
 コマバシロコブガ  — Nolathripa lactaria (Graeser, 1892)
 モモタマナコブガ  — Sarbena ustipennis (Hampson, 1895)
 カバイロコブガ  — Nola aerugula atomosa (Bremer, 1861)
 ホソバネコブガ  — Nola angustipennis Inoue, 1982
 ミヤラビコブガ  — Nola ceylonica Hampson, 1893
 ヒメコブガ  — Nola confusalis (Herrich-Schäffer, 1847)
 ウスカバスジコブガ  — Nola ebatoi (Inoue, 1970)
 ツマカバコブガ  — Nola emi (Inoue, 1956)
 フタモンコブガ  — Nola exumbrata Inoue, 1976
 クロバネコブガ  — Nola funesta Inoue, 1991
 ヒラノコブガ  — Nola hiranoi Inoue, 1991
 シタジロコブガ  — Nola infralba Inoue, 1976
 シタクロコブガ  — Nola infranigra Inoue, 1976
 クロフマエモンコブガ  — Nola innocua Butler, 1880
 マエモンコブガ  — Nola japonibia (Strand, 1920)
 シロオビコブガ  — Nola kanshireiensis (Wileman & South, 1916)
 カズナリコブガ  — Nola kazunarii Inoue, 2005
 ヒルギコブガ  — Nola komaii Inoue, 2001
 ミチノクコブガ  — Nola michinoku Sasaki, 2003
 ツマグロコブガ  — Nola minutalis Leech, [1889]
 ナミコブガ  — Nola nami (Inoue, 1956)
 シロバネコブガ  — Nola neglecta Inoue, 1991
 ソトグロコブガ  — Nola okanoi (Inoue, 1958)
 ムラサキコブガ  — Nola sakishimana Inoue, 2001
 ヤクシマヒメコブガ  — Nola semiconfusa Inoue, 1976
 エゾシロオビコブガ  — Nola shin Inoue, 1982
 クロスジシロコブガ  — Nola taeniata Snellen, 1874
 マルバコブガ  — Nola thyrophora (Hampson, 1914)
 ミスジコブガ  — Nola trilinea Marumo, 1923
 チョウカイシロコブガ  — Nola umetsui Sasaki, 1993
 スミコブガ  — Manoba banghaasi sumi (Inoue, 1956)
 テンスジコブガ  — Manoba brunellus (Hampson, 1893)
 ソトジロコブガ  — Manoba fasciatus Hampson, 1894
 トビモンコブガ  — Manoba major caesiopennis (Inoue, 1982)
 ヨシノコブガ  — Manoba melancholica (Wileman & West, 1928)
 シロフチビコブガ  — Manoba microphasma (Butler, 1885)
 トビモンシロコブガ奄美以南亜種  — Meganola albula formosana (Wileman & West, 1928)
 トビモンシロコブガ屋久島以北亜種  — Meganola albula pacifica (Inoue, 1958)
 トウホクチビコブガ  — Meganola basisignata Inoue, 1991
 モトグロコブガ北海道亜種  — Meganola bryophilalis basifascia (Inoue, 1958)
 モトグロコブガ本州以南亜種  — Meganola bryophilalis hondoensis (Inoue, 1970)
 ヘリグロコブガ  — Meganola costalis (Staudinger, 1887)
 クロスジコブガ  — Meganola fumosa (Butler, 1878)
 オオマエモンコブガ  — Meganola gigantoides (Inoue, 1961)
 オオコブガ  — Meganola gigas (Butler, 1884)
 ナカグロコブガ  — Meganola mediofascia (Inoue, 1958)
 ミカボコブガ  — Meganola mikabo (Inoue, 1970)
 ニセオオコブガ  — Meganola protogigas (Inoue, 1970)
 ツマモンコブガ  — Meganola pulchella (Leech, [1889])
 シメキクロコブガ  — Meganola shimekii (Inoue, 1970)
 エチゴチビコブガ  — Meganola strigulosa satoi (Inoue, 1970)
 キタオオコブガ  — Meganola subgigas Inoue, 1982
 イナズマコブガ  — Meganola triangulalis (Leech, [1889])
 リンゴコブガ  — Evonima mandschuriana (Oberthür, 1880)
 ミドリリンガ  — Clethrophora distincta (Leech, [1889])
 ツクシアオリンガ  — Hylophilodes tsukusensis Nagano, 1918
 アオスジアオリンガ  — Pseudoips prasinanus (Linnaeus, 1758)
 アカスジアオリンガ  — Pseudoips sylpha (Butler, 1879)
 リュウキュウコリンガ  — Narangodes haemorranta Hampson, 1910
 サラサリンガ  — Camptoloma interioratum (Walker, [1865])
 カバシタリンガ  — Xenochroa internifusca (Hampson, 1912)
 オレクギリンガ  — Parhylophila celsiana (Staudinger, 1887)
 カバイロリンガ  — Hypocarea conspicua (Leech, 1900)
 ウスアオリンガ  — Paracrama angulata Sugi, 1985
 トビイロリンガ  — Siglophora ferreilutea Hampson, 1895
 ギンボシリンガ  — Ariolica argentea (Butler, 1881)
 ハイイロリンガ  — Gabala argentata Butler, 1878
 アミメリンガ  — Sinna extrema (Walker, 1854)
 ナミスジキノカワガ  — Gyrtothripa pusilla (Moore, 1888)
 ツマジロキノカワガ  — Etanna breviuscula (Walker, 1863)
 ネスジキノカワガ  — Garella ruficirra (Hampson, 1905)
 クロスジキノカワガ  — Nycteola asiatica (Krulikowski, 1904)
 マエシロモンキノカワガ  — Nycteola costalis Sugi, 1959
 ミヤマクロスジキノカワガ  — Nycteola degenerana eurasiatica Dufay, 1961
 クロテンキノカワガ  — Nycteola dufayi Sugi, 1982
 ヒロバキノカワガ  — Giaura tortricoides (Walker, [1866])
 チャオビリンガ  — Maurilia iconica (Walker, 1858)
 スカシチャオビリンガ  — Maceda mansueta Walker, 1858
 アカオビリンガ  — Gelastocera exusta Butler, 1877
 クロオビリンガ  — Gelastocera kotschubeji Obraztsov, 1943
 和名未定  — Gelastocera ochroleucana Staudinger, 1887
 クロモンオビリンガ  — Gelastocera rubicundula (Wileman, 1911)
 カマフリンガ  — Macrochthonia fervens Butler, 1881
 ハネモンリンガ  — Kerala decipiens (Butler, 1879)
 マエキリンガ  — Iragaodes nobilis (Staudinger, 1887)
 シロズリンガ  — Westermannia elliptica Bryk, 1913
 マガタマリンガ  — Miaromima kobesi (Sugi, 1991)
 アジアキノカワガ  — Blenina quinaria Moore, 1882
 キノカワガ  — Blenina senex (Butler, 1878)
 ミナミキノカワガ  — Risoba basalis Moore, 1881
 リュウキュウキノカワガ  — Risoba prominens Moore, 1881
 ワタリンガ  — Earias cupreoviridis (Walker, 1862)
 モモブトアオリンガ  — Earias dilatifemur Sugi, 1982
 ウスベニアオリンガ  — Earias erubescens Staudinger, 1887
 ミスジアオリンガ  — Earias insulana (Boisduval, 1833)
 アカマエアオリンガ  — Earias pudicana Staudinger, 1887
 ベニモンアオリンガ  — Earias roseifera Butler, 1881
 オオベニモンアオリンガ  — Earias roseoviridis Sugi, 1982
 クサオビリンガ  — Earias vittella (Fabricius, 1794)
 ネジロキノカワガ  — Negritothripa hampsoni (Wileman, 1911)
 ヤエヤマキノカワガ  — Iscadia pulchra (Butler, 1886)
 ナンキンキノカワガ  — Gadirtha impingens Walker, [1858]
 シンジュキノカワガ  — Eligma narcissus narcissus (Cramer, 1775)
 マルバネキノカワガ  — Selepa celtis Moore, 1860
 ウズモンキノカワガ  — Selepa molybdea Hampson, 1912
 ギンバネキノカワガ  — Macrobarasa xantholopha (Hampson, 1896)

Pantheidae
 マルバネキシタケンモン  — Trisuloides rotundipennis Sugi, 1976
 ホリシャキシタケンモン  — Trisuloides sericea Butler, 1881
 コウスベリケンモン  — Anacronicta caliginea (Butler, 1881)
 ウスベリケンモン  — Anacronicta nitida (Butler, 1878)
 オキナワウスベリケンモン  — Anacronicta okinawensis Sugi, 1970
 ナマリケンモン  — Anacronicta plumbea (Butler, 1881)
 ニセキバラケンモン  — Trichosea ainu (Wileman, 1911)
 キバラケンモン  — Trichosea champa (Moore, 1879)
 キタキバラケンモン  — Trichosea ludifica (Linnaeus, 1758)
 カラフトゴマケンモン  — Panthea coenobita idae Bryk, 1949
 ネグロケンモン  — Colocasia jezoensis (Matsumura, 1931)
 ケブカネグロケンモン  — Colocasia mus (Oberthür, 1884)
 ヒメネグロケンモン  — Colocasia umbrosa (Wileman, 1911)

Noctuidae
 キシタヒトリモドキ  — Asota caricae (Fabricius, 1775)
 キイロヒトリモドキ  — Asota egens confinis Rothschild, 1897
 イチジクヒトリモドキ  — Asota ficus (Fabricius, 1775)
 シロスジヒトリモドキ  — Asota heliconia riukiuana Rothschild, 1897
 ホシヒトリモドキ  — Asota plana lacteata (Butler, 1881)
 ミナミヒトリモドキ  — Euplocia membliaria (Cramer, 1780)
 クロジャノメアツバ  — Bocana manifestalis Walker, 1859
 キマエアツバ  — Adrapsa ablualis Walker, 1859
 フジロアツバ  — Adrapsa notigera (Butler, 1879)
 シラナミクロアツバ  — Adrapsa simplex (Butler, 1879)
 ニセフジロアツバ  — Adrapsa subnotigera Owada, 1982
 ソトウスグロアツバ  — Hydrillodes lentalis Guenée, 1854
 ヒロオビウスグロアツバ  — Hydrillodes morosus (Butler, 1879)
 マルバネウスグロアツバ  — Hydrillodes pacificus Owada, 1982
 ハネブタアツバ  — Hydrillodes uenoi Owada, 1987
 マルシラホシアツバ  — Edessena gentiusalis Walker, [1859]
 オオシラホシアツバ  — Edessena hamada (Felder & Rogenhofer, 1874)
 ハナマガリアツバ  — Hadennia incongruens (Butler, 1879)
 シロテンハナマガリアツバ  — Hadennia mysalis (Walker, 1859)
 ヒメハナマガリアツバ  — Hadennia nakatanii Owada, 1979
 ソトウスアツバ  — Hadennia obliqua (Wileman, 1911)
 フサキバアツバ  — Mosopia sordida (Butler, 1879)
 キスジハナオイアツバ  — Cidariplura bilineata (Wileman & South, 1919)
 ハナオイアツバ  — Cidariplura gladiata Butler, 1879
 カギモンハナオイアツバ  — Cidariplura signata (Butler, 1879)
 シロホシクロアツバ  — Idia curvipalpis (Butler, 1879)
 ツマジロクロアツバ  — Idia fulvipicta (Butler, 1889)
 キモンクロアツバ  — Idia quadra (Graeser, [1889])
 シロモンアツバ  — Paracolax albinotata (Butler, 1879)
 ハグルマアツバ  — Paracolax angulata (Wileman, 1915)
 ニセミスジアツバ  — Paracolax bilineata (Wileman, 1915)
 ホソキモンアツバ  — Paracolax contigua (Leech, 1900)
 オビアツバ  — Paracolax fascialis (Leech, 1889)
 ホソナミアツバ  — Paracolax fentoni (Butler, 1879)
 ヤマトアツバ  — Paracolax japonica Owada, 1987
 クロキバアツバ  — Paracolax pacifica Owada, 1982
 シロテンムラサキアツバ  — Paracolax pryeri (Butler, 1879)
 ウスキモンアツバ  — Paracolax sugii Owada, 1992
 ミスジアツバ  — Paracolax trilinealis (Bremer, 1864)
 クルマアツバ  — Paracolax tristalis (Fabricius, 1794)
 フタスジアツバ  — Bertula bistrigata (Staudinger, 1888)
 ウチキアツバ  — Bertula sinuosa (Leech, 1900)
 シロスジアツバ  — Bertula spacoalis (Walker, 1859)
 ヒメヒゲブトクロアツバ  — Nodaria externalis Guenée, 1854
 オガサワラヒゲブトクロアツバ  — Nodaria ogasawarensis Owada, 1987
 ヒゲブトクロアツバ  — Nodaria tristis (Butler, 1879)
 イワアツバ  — Megaloctena buxivora Owada, 1991
 リュウキュウアカマエアツバ  — Simplicia caeneusalis (Walker, [1859])
 シロヘリアツバ  — Simplicia mistacalis (Guenée, 1854)
 オオアカマエアツバ  — Simplicia niphona (Butler, 1878)
 アカマエアツバ  — Simplicia rectalis (Eversmann, 1842)
 ニセアカマエアツバ  — Simplicia xanthoma Prout, 1928
 オオキイロアツバ  — Pseudalelimma miwai Inoue, 1965
 カシワアツバ  — Pechipogo strigilata (Linnaeus, 1758)
 ナガキバアツバ  — Polypogon gryphalis (Herrich-Schäffer, 1851)
 和名未定  — Polypogon tentacularia (Linnaeus, 1758)
 ホンドコブヒゲアツバ  — Zanclognatha curvilinea (Wileman & South, 1917)
 ウスグロアツバ  — Zanclognatha fumosa (Butler, 1879)
 ツマオビアツバ  — Zanclognatha griselda (Butler, 1879)
 キイロアツバ  — Zanclognatha helva (Butler, 1879)
 ウスイロアツバ  — Zanclognatha lilacina (Butler, 1879)
 コブヒゲアツバ  — Zanclognatha lunalis (Scopoli, 1763)
 ハスオビアツバ  — Zanclognatha obliqua Staudinger, 1892
 カサイヌマアツバ  — Zanclognatha perfractralis Bryk, 1948
 アミメアツバ  — Zanclognatha reticulatis (Leech, 1900)
 コウスグロアツバ  — Zanclognatha southi Owada, 1982
 ヒメツマオビアツバ  — Zanclognatha subgriselda Sugi, 1959
 ヒメコブヒゲアツバ  — Zanclognatha tarsipennalis (Treitschke, 1835)
 ツマテンコブヒゲアツバ  — Zanclognatha triplex (Leech, 1900)
 チョウセンコウスグロアツバ  — Zanclognatha umbrosalis Staudinger, 1892
 ウラジロアツバ  — Zanclognatha violacealis Staudinger, 1892
 ヤエヤマコブヒゲアツバ  — Zanclognatha yaeyamalis Owada, 1977
 ヤクシマコブヒゲアツバ  — Zanclognatha yakushimalis Sugi, 1959
 ウスキミスジアツバ  — Herminia arenosa Butler, 1878
 フシキアツバ  — Herminia dolosa Butler, 1879
 クロスジアツバ  — Herminia grisealis ([Denis & Schiffermüller], 1775)
 シラナミアツバ  — Herminia innocens Butler, 1879
 ヒメナミアツバ  — Herminia kurokoi Owada, 1987
 ヨスジカバイロアツバ  — Herminia robiginosa (Staudinger, 1888)
 フサハラアツバ  — Herminia ryukyuensis Owada, 1982
 キタミスジアツバ  — Herminia stramentacealis Bremer, 1864
 トビスジアツバ  — Herminia tarsicrinalis (Knoch, 1782)
 タイワンシラナミアツバ  — Herminia terminalis (Wileman, 1915)
 オオシラナミアツバ  — Hipoepa fractalis (Guenée, 1854)
 ハネナガキイロアツバ  — Stenhypena longipennis Owada, 1982
 ムモンキイロアツバ  — Stenhypena nigripuncta (Wileman, 1911)
 ミツオビキンアツバ  — Sinarella aegrota (Butler, 1879)
 シーモンアツバ  — Sinarella c-album Owada, 1992
 ウスナミアツバ  — Sinarella itoi Owada, 1987
 クロミツボシアツバ  — Sinarella japonica (Butler, 1881)
 クロテンナミアツバ  — Sinarella nigrisigna (Leech, 1900)
 ネグロアツバ  — Sinarella punctalis (Herz, 1905)
 ヒメクロアツバ  — Sinarella rotundipennis Owada, 1982
 オスグロナミアツバ  — Progonia kurosawai Owada, 1987
 オキナワナミアツバ  — Progonia oileusalis (Walker, 1859)
 マエキトガリアツバ  — Anoratha costalis Moore, 1867
 テングアツバ  — Latirostrum bisacutum Hampson, 1895
 トガリアツバ  — Rhynchina cramboides (Butler, 1879)
 ナカジロアツバ  — Harita belinda (Butler, 1879)
 サザナミアツバ  — Hypena abducalis Walker, 1859
 クロキシタアツバ  — Hypena amica (Butler, 1878)
 キシタアツバ  — Hypena claripennis (Butler, 1878)
 ウスベリアツバ  — Hypena conscitalis Walker, [1866]
 ソトムラサキアツバ  — Hypena ella Butler, 1878
 ヒトスジクロアツバ  — Hypena furva Wileman, 1911
 セクロモンアツバ  — Hypena gonospilalis Walker, 1866
 和名未定  — Hypena hokkaidalis (Wileman & West, 1930)
 トビモンアツバ  — Hypena indicatalis Walker, 1859
 ウスチャモンアツバ  — Hypena innocuoides Poole, 1989
 ソトウスナミガタアツバ  — Hypena kengkalis Bremer, 1864
 ランタナアツバ  — Hypena laceratalis Guenée, 1859
 和名未定  — Hypena leechi Sugi, 1982
 オスグロホソバアツバ  — Hypena lignealis Walker, 1866
 スジアツバ  — Hypena masurialis masurialis Guenée, 1854
 ムラサキミツボシアツバ  — Hypena narratalis Walker, 1859
 オオトビモンアツバ  — Hypena occata Moore, 1882
 フタオビアツバ  — Hypena proboscidalis (Linnaeus, 1758)
 コテングアツバ  — Hypena pulverulenta Wileman, 1911
 モンクロキシタアツバ  — Hypena sagitta (Fabricius, 1775)
 サツマアツバ  — Hypena satsumalis Leech, 1889
 ナミガタアツバ  — Hypena similalis Leech, [1889]
 フタコブスジアツバ  — Hypena sinuosa Wileman, 1911
 ナミテンアツバ  — Hypena strigatus minna Butler, 1879
 アオアツバ  — Hypena subcyanea Butler, 1880
 和名未定  — Hypena tamsi Filipjev, 1927
 ヒトスジアツバ  — Hypena tatorhina Butler, 1879
 タイワンキシタアツバ  — Hypena trigonalis (Guenée, 1854)
 ミツボシアツバ  — Hypena tristalis Lederer, 1853
 ホソバアツバ  — Hypena whitelyi (Butler, 1879)
 和名未定  — Hypena yoshinalis (Wileman & West, 1930)
 ナカシロテンアツバ  — Bomolocha albopunctalis (Leech, [1889])
 アマミヤマガタアツバ  — Bomolocha amamiensis Sugi, 1982
 シモフリヤマガタアツバ  — Bomolocha benepartita Sugi, 1982
 マルモンウスヅマアツバ  — Bomolocha bicoloralis Graeser, 1889
 エゾソトジロアツバ  — Bomolocha bipartita Staudinger, 1892
 マガリウスヅマアツバ  — Bomolocha mandarina (Leech, 1900)
 ムラクモアツバ  — Bomolocha melanica Sugi, 1959
 ホシムラサキアツバ  — Bomolocha nigrobasalis Herz, 1905
 ウスヅマアツバ  — Bomolocha perspicua (Leech, 1900)
 アイモンアツバ  — Bomolocha rivuligera (Butler, 1881)
 ミヤマソトジロアツバ  — Bomolocha semialbata Sugi, 1982
 ハングロアツバ  — Bomolocha squalida (Butler, 1879)
 ヤマガタアツバ  — Bomolocha stygiana (Butler, 1878)
 シラクモアツバ  — Bomolocha zilla (Butler, 1879)
 シラフアカガネアツバ  — Rivula albipunctata Yoshimoto, 1996
 ネグロアトキリアツバ  — Rivula basalis Hampson, 1891
 アトキリアツバ  — Rivula cognata Hampson, 1912
 マエシロモンアツバ  — Rivula curvifera Walker, 1862
 トビイロフタテンアツバ  — Rivula errabunda Wileman, 1911
 フタテンアツバ  — Rivula inconspicua (Butler, 1881)
 タケアツバ  — Rivula leucanioides (Walker, [1863])
 クリイロアツバ  — Rivula plumipars Hampson, 1907
 テンクロアツバ  — Rivula sericealis (Scopoli, 1763)
 キクビムモンアツバ  — Rivula unctalis Staudinger, 1892
 ナカジロフサヤガ  — Penicillaria jocosatrix Guenée, 1852
 オビナカジロフサヤガ  — Penicillaria maculata Butler, 1889
 シロモンフサヤガ  — Phalga clarirena (Sugi, 1982)
 コフサヤガ  — Eutelia adulatricoides (Mell, 1943)
 キマダラフサヤガ  — Eutelia cuneades (Draudt, 1950)
 フサヤガ  — Eutelia geyeri (Felder & Rogenhofer, 1874)
 ニッコウフサヤガ  — Atacira grabczewskii (Püngeler, 1903)
 ウスイロフサヤガ  — Atacira melanephra (Hampson, 1912)
 カドジロフサヤガ  — Anigraea albomaculata Hampson, 1894
 ノコバフサヤガ  — Anuga japonica (Leech, [1889])
 ヒメネグロフサヤガ  — Targalla delatrix (Guenée, 1852)
 マンゴーフサヤガ  — Chlumetia brevisigna Holloway, 1985
 スカシホソヤガ  — Stictoptera cucullioides Guenée, 1852
 ソリバネホソヤガ  — Aegilia describens (Walker, [1858])
 アオフホソヤガ  — Lophoptera acuda (Swinhoe, 1906)
 チャマダラホソヤガ  — Lophoptera anthyalus (Hampson, 1894)
 ヤマトホソヤガ  — Lophoptera hayesi Sugi, 1982
 ネグロホソヤガ  — Lophoptera phaeobasis Hampson, 1905
 シロスジクロホソヤガ  — Lophoptera squammigera Guenée, 1852
 クロシタホソヤガ  — Odontodes uniformis Berio, 1957
 マガリミジンアツバ  — Hypenodes curvilineus Sugi, 1982
 ミジンアツバ  — Hypenodes rectifascia Sugi, 1982
 ハスジミジンアツバ  — Hypenodes turfosalis (Wocke, 1850)
 キマダラチビアツバ  — Protoschrankia ijimai Sugi, 1979
 キオビマダラチビアツバ  — Protoschrankia minuta Sugi, 1985
 ウスマダラチビアツバ  — Protoschrankia murakii Sugi, 1979
 クロスジヒメアツバ  — Schrankia costaestrigalis (Stephens, 1834)
 メスグロヒメアツバ  — Schrankia dimorpha Inoue, 1979
 マルモンヒメアツバ  — Schrankia kogii Inoue, 1979
 ウスオビヒメアツバ  — Schrankia masuii Inoue, 1979
 アマミヒメアツバ  — Schrankia seinoi Inoue, 1979
 ハスオビヒメアツバ  — Schrankia separatalis (Herz, 1905)
 チビアツバ  — Luceria fletcheri Inoue, 1958
 ミナミチビアツバ  — Luceria oculalis (Moore, 1877)
 ウスイロアカキリバ  — Anomis figlina Butler, 1889
 ワタアカキリバ  — Cosmophila flava flava (Fabricius, 1775)
 コアカキリバ  — Cosmophila lyona (Swinhoe, 1919)
 ヒメアカキリバ  — Gonitis involuta (Walker, 1858)
 アカキリバ  — Gonitis mesogona (Walker, 1858)
 オキナワオオアカキリバ  — Rusicada albitibia (Walker, [1857-1858])
 カバイロオオアカキリバ  — Rusicada fulvida (Guenée, 1852)
 ムラサキオオアカキリバ  — Rusicada leucolopha Prout, 1928
 オオアカキリバ  — Rusicada privata (Walker, 1865)
 ハガタキリバ  — Scoliopteryx libatrix (Linnaeus, 1758)
 プライヤキリバ  — Goniocraspidum pryeri (Leech, [1889])
 ハイイロオオエグリバ  — Calyptra albivirgata (Hampson, 1926)
 オオエグリバ  — Calyptra gruesa (Draudt, 1950)
 キタエグリバ  — Calyptra hokkaida (Wileman, 1922)
 キンイロエグリバ  — Calyptra lata (Butler, 1881)
 ミナミエグリバ  — Calyptra minuticornis minuticornis (Guenée, 1852)
 マエスジエグリバ  — Calyptra orthograpta (Butler, 1886)
 ウスエグリバ  — Calyptra thalictri (Borkhausen, 1790)
 ギンスジエグリバ  — Oraesia argyrosticta Moore, 1884
 ヒメエグリバ  — Oraesia emarginata (Fabricius, 1794)
 アカエグリバ  — Oraesia excavata (Butler, 1878)
 マダラエグリバ  — Plusiodonta casta (Butler, 1878)
 キンモンエグリバ  — Plusiodonta coelonota (Kollar, [1844])
 ミドリモンコノハ  — Eudocima homaena (Hübner, [1823])
 ヒメアケビコノハ  — Eudocima phalonia (Linnaeus, [1763])
 キマエコノハ  — Eudocima salaminia (Cramer, 1777)
 アケビコノハ  — Eudocima tyrannus (Guenée, 1852)
 ドウブトクチバ  — Platyja umminia (Cramer, [1780])
 コシロシタバ  — Catocala actaea Felder & Rogenhofer, 1874
 ハイモンキシタバ  — Catocala agitatrix mabella Holland, 1889
 ノコメキシタバ  — Catocala bella Butler, 1877
 ナマリキシタバ  — Catocala columbina yoshihikoi Ishizuka, 2002
 ヨシノキシタバ  — Catocala connexa Butler, 1881
 ケンモンキシタバ  — Catocala deuteronympha omphale Butler, 1881
 エゾシロシタバ  — Catocala dissimilis Bremer, 1861
 オニベニシタバ  — Catocala dula dula Bremer, 1861
 マメキシタバ  — Catocala duplicata Butler, 1885
 ベニシタバ  — Catocala electa zalmunna Butler, 1877
 ミヤマキシタバ  — Catocala ella Butler, 1877
 ムラサキシタバ  — Catocala fraxini jezoensis Matsumura, 1931
 ワモンキシタバ  — Catocala fulminea xarippe Butler, 1877
 アミメキシタバ  — Catocala hyperconnexa Sugi, 1965
 ウスイロキシタバ  — Catocala intacta intacta Leech, [1889]
 ジョナスキシタバ  — Catocala jonasii Butler, 1877
 アズミキシタバ  — Catocala koreana Staudinger, 1892
 クロシオキシタバ  — Catocala kuangtungensis sugii Ishizuka, 2002
 オオシロシタバ  — Catocala lara lara Bremer, 1861
 アマミキシタバ  — Catocala macula (Hampson, 1891)
 カバフキシタバ  — Catocala mirifica Butler, 1877
 ヒメシロシタバ  — Catocala nagioides Wileman, 1924
 シロシタバ  — Catocala nivea nivea Butler, 1877
 ゴマシオキシタバ  — Catocala nubila Butler, 1881
 エゾベニシタバ  — Catocala nupta nozawae Matsumura, 1911
 キシタバ  — Catocala patala Felder & Rogenhofer, 1874
 コガタキシタバ  — Catocala praegnax praegnax Walker, [1858]
 フシキキシタバ  — Catocala separans Leech, [1889]
 アサマキシタバ  — Catocala streckeri Staudinger, 1888
 ヤクシマヒメキシタバ  — Catocala tokui tokui Sugi, 1976
 ヒロオビクロモンシタバ  — Ophiusa disjungens indiscriminata (Hampson, 1893)
 コクロモンシタバ  — Ophiusa microtirhaca Sugi, 1990
 コヘリグロクチバ  — Ophiusa olista (Swinhoe, 1893)
 クロモンシタバ  — Ophiusa tirhaca (Cramer, 1777)
 キバネヘリグロクチバ  — Ophiusa trapezium (Guenée, 1852)
 ヘリグロクチバ  — Ophiusa triphaenoides (Walker, 1858)
 キモンクチバ  — Ophisma gravata Guenée, 1852
 シラホシアシブトクチバ  — Achaea janata (Linnaeus, 1758)
 オオシラホシアシブトクチバ  — Achaea serva (Fabricius, 1775)
 タイリクアシブトクチバ  — Dysgonia mandschurica (Staudinger, 1892)
 アシブトクチバ  — Dysgonia stuposa (Fabricius, 1794)
 オキナワアシブトクチバ  — Bastilla arcuata (Moore, 1887)
 キオビアシブトクチバ  — Bastilla fulvotaenia (Guenée, 1852)
 ナタモンアシブトクチバ  — Bastilla joviana (Stoll, 1782)
 ムラサキアシブトクチバ  — Bastilla maturata (Walker, 1858)
 ホソオビアシブトクチバ  — Parallelia arctotaenia (Guenée, 1852)
 ヒメアシブトクチバ  — Parallelia dulcis (Butler, 1878)
 ツマムラサキクチバ  — Pindara illibata (Fabricius, 1775)
 ババアシブトクチバ  — Buzara onelia (Guenée, 1852)
 シロモンアシブトクチバ  — Macaldenia palumba (Guenée, 1852)
 ナカグロクチバ  — Grammodes geometrica (Fabricius, 1775)
 スジボソサンカククチバ  — Chalciope mygdon (Cramer, 1777)
 ツメクサキシタバ  — Euclidia dentata Staudinger, 1871
 ニセウンモンクチバ  — Mocis ancilla (Warren, 1913)
 ウンモンクチバ  — Mocis annetta (Butler, 1878)
 ヒメウンモンクチバ  — Mocis dolosa (Butler, 1880)
 ウスオビクチバ  — Mocis frugalis (Fabricius, 1775)
 オオウンモンクチバ  — Mocis undata (Fabricius, 1775)
 サンカククチバ  — Trigonodes hyppasia hyppasia (Cramer, 1779)
 フタクロオビクチバ  — Melapia bifasciata (Inoue & Sugi, 1961)
 ユミモンクチバ  — Melapia electaria (Bremer, 1864)
 クロスジユミモンクチバ  — Melapia japonica (Ogata, 1961)
 ヤエヤマサンカククチバ  — Melapia kishidai Sugi, 1968
 チズモンクチバ  — Avatha discolor (Fabricius, 1794)
 シラホシモクメクチバ  — Ercheia dubia (Butler, 1874)
 モンシロムラサキクチバ  — Ercheia niveostrigata Warren, 1913
 モンムラサキクチバ  — Ercheia umbrosa Butler, 1881
 シロオビクチバ  — Cortyta grisea (Leech, 1900)
 ベニモンコノハ  — Phyllodes consobrinus Westwood, 1848
 キシタアシブトクチバ  — Thyas coronata (Fabricius, 1775)
 シタベニコノハ  — Thyas honesta Hübner, [1824]
 ムクゲコノハ  — Thyas juno (Dalman, 1823)
 Tochara creberrima (Walker, 1858)
 ツキワクチバ  — Artena dotata (Fabricius, 1794)
 フクラスズメ  — Arcte coerula (Guenée, 1852)
 オオムラサキクチバ  — Anisoneura aluco (Fabricius, 1775)
 ヤエナミクチバ  — Anisoneura salebrosa (Guenée, 1852)
 ホウオウボククチバ  — Pericyma cruegeri (Butler, 1886)
 カキバトモエ  — Hypopyra vespertilio (Fabricius, 1787)
 ハグルマトモエ  — Spirama helicina (Hübner, [1831])
 オスグロトモエ  — Spirama retorta (Clerck, 1759)
 オオトモエ  — Erebus ephesperis (Hübner, [1823])
 ヨコヅナトモエ  — Erebus macrops (Linnaeus, 1768)
 シロスジトモエ  — Metopta rectifasciata (Ménétriès, 1863)
 モクメクチバ  — Perinaenia accipiter (Felder & Rogenhofer, 1874)
 ハイマダラクチバ  — Autophila inconspicua (Butler, 1881)
 ツマキオオクチバ  — Hulodes caranea (Cramer, 1780)
 ハイイロクビグロクチバ  — Lygephila craccae ([Denis & Schiffermüller], 1775)
 ナニワクビグロクチバ  — Lygephila lilacina (Butler, 1878)
 クビグロクチバ  — Lygephila maxima (Bremer, 1861)
 スミレクビグロクチバ  — Lygephila nigricostata (Graeser, 1890)
 エゾクビグロクチバ  — Lygephila pastinum (Treitschke, 1826)
 ヒメクビグロクチバ  — Lygephila recta (Bremer, 1864)
 キタヒメクビグロクチバ  — Lygephila subrecta Sugi, 1982
 ウスクビグロクチバ  — Lygephila viciae (Hübner, [1822])
 アサマクビグロクチバ  — Lygephila vulcanea (Butler, 1881)
 ヒロオビキシタクチバ  — Hypocala biarcuata Walker, 1858
 ムーアキシタクチバ  — Hypocala deflorata deflorata (Fabricius, 1794)
 インドキシタクチバ  — Hypocala rostrata (Fabricius, 1794)
 タイワンキシタクチバ  — Hypocala subsatura Guenée, 1852
 ヘリボシキシタクチバ  — Hypocala violacea Butler, 1879
 サビモンルリオビクチバ  — Ischyja ferrifracta Walker, 1864
 オオルリオビクチバ  — Ischyja manlia (Cramer, 1776)
 コルリモンクチバ  — Lacera noctilio (Fabricius, 1794)
 ルリモンクチバ  — Lacera procellosa Butler, 1879
 アカテンクチバ  — Erygia apicalis Guenée, 1852
 ネジロフトクチバ  — Serrodes campanus Guenée, 1852
 クロミミモンクチバ  — Oxyodes scrobiculatus scrobiculatus (Fabricius, 1775)
 クロシラフクチバ  — Sypnoides fumosus (Butler, 1877)
 アヤシラフクチバ  — Sypnoides hercules (Butler, 1881)
 シラフクチバ  — Sypnoides picta (Butler, 1877)
 シロテンクチバ  — Hypersypnoides astrigera (Butler, 1885)
 オオシロテンクチバ  — Hypersypnoides submarginata (Walker, 1865)
 ハガタクチバ  — Daddala lucilla (Butler, 1881)
 サザナミクチバ  — Polydesma boarmoides Guenée, 1852
 ホラズミクチバ  — Speiredonia inocellata Sugi, 1996
 ヤエヤマウスムラサキクチバ  — Ericeia inangulata (Guenée, 1852)
 ウスムラサキクチバ  — Ericeia pertendens (Walker, 1858)
 ホソバウスムラサキクチバ  — Ericeia subcinerea (Snellen, 1880)
 ハイイロクチバ  — Pandesma quenavadi Guenée, 1852
 クロモンハイイロクチバ  — Bamra albicola (Walker, 1858)
 クロエリクチバ  — Pantydia metaspila (Walker, 1858)
 ゴマコウンモンクチバ  — Blasticorhinus rivulosa (Walker, 1865)
 コウンモンクチバ  — Blasticorhinus ussuriensis (Bremer, 1861)
 クマモトナカジロシタバ  — Aedia kumamotonis (Matsumura, 1926)
 ナカジロシタバ  — Aedia leucomelas (Linnaeus, 1758)
 ヒメナカジロシタバ  — Ecpatia longinquua (Swinhoe, 1890)
 カクモンキシタバ  — Chrysorithrum amatum (Bremer & Grey, 1853)
 ウンモンキシタバ  — Chrysorithrum flavomaculatum (Bremer, 1861)
 ツマグロクチバ  — Borsippa diffusa (Swinhoe, 1890)
 マルモンクチバ  — Bocula caradrinoides Guenée, 1852
 ウスヅマクチバ  — Dinumma deponens Walker, 1858
 ヒメウスヅマクチバ  — Dinumma placens Walker, 1858
 ミミモンクチバ  — Anticarsia irrorata (Fabricius, 1781)
 カバフキリバ  — Episparis okinawensis Sugi, 1982
 ハナジロクチバ  — Hypospila bolinoides Guenée, 1852
 ウスズミクチバ  — Hyposemansis singha Guenée, 1852
 オオトウウスグロクチバ  — Avitta fasciosa Moore, 1882
 ウスグロクチバ  — Avitta puncta Wileman, 1911
 イナズマヒメクチバ  — Mecodina albodentata (Swinhoe, 1895)
 カバフヒメクチバ  — Mecodina cineracea (Butler, 1879)
 フトオビシャクドウクチバ  — Mecodina fasciata Sugi, 1982
 オキナワマエモンヒメクチバ  — Mecodina kurosawai Sugi, 1982
 シャクドウクチバ  — Mecodina nubiferalis (Leech, 1889)
 ムラサキヒメクチバ  — Mecodina subviolacea (Butler, 1881)
 アマミシャクドウクチバ  — Mecodina sugii Seino, 2003
 ヒゲナガヒメクチバ  — Seneratia praecipua (Walker, 1865)
 ソトジロツマキリクチバ  — Arytrura musculus (Ménétriès, 1859)
 チョウセンツマキリアツバ  — Tamba corealis (Leech, 1889)
 ウスベニツマキリアツバ  — Tamba gensanalis (Leech, 1889)
 カザリツマキリアツバ  — Tamba igniflua (Wileman & South, 1917)
 トウカイツマキリアツバ  — Tamba roseopurpurea Sugi, 1982
 和名未定  — Tamba suffusa Wileman, 1911
 ウスモモイロアツバ  — Olulis ayumiae Sugi, 1982
 ツマムラサキアツバ  — Olulis japonica Sugi, 1982
 ソトハガタアツバ  — Olulis puncticinctalis Walker, 1863
 ツマエビイロアツバ  — Olulis shigakii Sugi, 1982
 ソトウスベニアツバ  — Sarcopteron fasciatum (Wileman & South, 1917)
 クロシモフリアツバ  — Atuntsea kogii (Sugi, 1977)
 マエホシツマキリアツバ  — Tipasa renalis (Moore, [1885])
 マエモンツマキリアツバ  — Pangrapta costinotata (Butler, 1881)
 ムラサキツマキリアツバ  — Pangrapta curtalis (Walker, [1866])
 ナカグロツマキリアツバ  — Pangrapta disruptalis (Walker, [1855])
 キモンツマキリアツバ  — Pangrapta flavomacula Staudinger, 1888
 ツマジロツマキリアツバ  — Pangrapta lunulata (Sterz, 1915)
 アサマツマキリアツバ  — Pangrapta minor Sugi, 1982
 リンゴツマキリアツバ  — Pangrapta obscurata (Butler, 1879)
 ウンモンツマキリアツバ  — Pangrapta perturbans (Walker, 1858)
 シロツマキリアツバ  — Pangrapta porphyrea (Butler, 1879)
 ウゴウンモンツマキリアツバ  — Pangrapta suaveola Staudinger, 1888
 ツシマツマキリアツバ  — Pangrapta trilineata (Leech, 1900)
 シロモンツマキリアツバ  — Pangrapta umbrosa (Leech, 1900)
 ミツボシツマキリアツバ  — Pangrapta vasava (Butler, 1881)
 ヨシノツマキリアツバ  — Pangrapta yoshinensis Wileman & West, 1928
 マンレイツマキリアツバ  — Polysciera manleyi (Leech, 1900)
 ホソツマキリアツバ  — Stenograpta stenoptera Sugi, 1959
 シロテンツマキリアツバ  — Amphitrogia amphidecta (Butler, 1879)
 ホソキバツマキリアツバ  — Cultripalpa partita Guenée, 1852
 マエベニモンツマキリアツバ  — Ectogoniella insularis Sugi, 1982
 ツマグロエグリアツバ  — Nagadeba indecoralis Walker, [1866]
 ウラモンシロクチバ  — Masca abactalis Walker, [1859]
 アトホシボシアツバ  — Caduca albopunctata (Walker, [1858])
 アトエグリアツバ  — Arsacia rectalis (Walker, 1863)
 マノアツバ  — Goniocraspedon manoi Yoshimoto, 1993
 ミカドアツバ  — Lophomilia flaviplaga (Warren, 1912)
 キマダラアツバ  — Lophomilia polybapta (Butler, 1879)
 ニセミカドアツバ  — Lophomilia takao Sugi, 1962
 ヒメエグリアツバ  — Euwilemania angulata (Wileman, 1911)
 シロテンアツバ  — Stenbergmania albomaculalis (Bremer, 1864)
 フタスジエグリアツバ  — Gonepatica opalina (Butler, 1879)
 シマアツバ  — Hepatica linealis (Leech, 1889)
 ナンキシマアツバ  — Hepatica nakatanii Sugi, 1982
 ヤエヤマシマアツバ  — Hepatica seinoi Sugi, 1982
 ナミグルマアツバ  — Anatatha lignea (Butler, 1879)
 ヒメナミグルマアツバ  — Anatatha misae Sugi, 1982
 クロオビアツバ  — Anatatha wilemani (Sugi, 1958)
 ムラサキアツバ  — Diomea cremata (Butler, 1878)
 ヨツモンムラサキアツバ  — Diomea discisigna Sugi, 1963
 ミナミマエヘリモンアツバ  — Diomea insulana Yoshimoto, 2001
 マエヘリモンアツバ  — Diomea jankowskii (Oberthür, 1880)
 マエジロアツバ  — Hypostrotia cinerea (Butler, 1878)
 ウスマダラアツバ  — Scedopla diffusa Sugi, 1959
 アマミソトグロアツバ  — Scedopla inouei Sugi, 1982
 キヅマアツバ  — Scedopla regalis Butler, 1878
 トビフタスジアツバ  — Leiostola mollis (Butler, 1879)
 ムスジアツバ  — Loxioda parva Sugi, 1982
 キイロソトオビアツバ  — Draganodes coronata Sugi, 1982
 ベニトガリアツバ  — Naganoella timandra (Alphéraky, 1897)
 コハイイロアツバ  — Gesonia obeditalis Walker, 1859
 ベニスジアツバ  — Phytometra amata (Butler, 1879)
 和名未定  — Phytometra hebescens (Butler, 1879)
 和名未定  — Phytometra pryeri (Wileman & South, 1917)
 ダルマアツバ  — Daona bilinealis (Leech, 1900)
 リュウキュウダルマアツバ  — Daona mansueta Walker, 1864
 ニジオビベニアツバ  — Homodes vivida Guenée, 1852
 オビマダラアツバ  — Raparna roseata Wileman & South, 1917
 和名未定  — Raparna transversa Moore, 1882
 ソトキイロアツバ  — Oglasa bifidalis (Leech, 1889)
 チャイロアツバ  — Britha inambitiosa (Leech, 1900)
 キンスジアツバ  — Colobochyla salicalis ([Denis & Schiffermüller], 1775)
 ヒメエビイロアツバ  — Maguda suffusa (Walker, 1863)
 マエクロモンアツバ  — Panilla costipunctata Leech, 1900
 オオトウアツバ  — Panilla petrina (Butler, 1879)
 マエテンアツバ  — Rhesala imparata Walker, 1858
 カギアツバ  — Laspeyria flexula ([Denis & Schiffermüller], 1775)
 キボシアツバ  — Paragabara flavomacula (Oberthür, 1880)
 チャバネキボシアツバ  — Paragabara ochreipennis Sugi, 1962
 セニジモンアツバ  — Paragona cleorides Wileman, 1911
 ウスグロセニジモンアツバ  — Paragona inchoata (Wileman, 1911)
 ヨコハマセニジモンアツバ  — Paragona multisignata (Christoph, 1888)
 アトヘリヒトホシアツバ  — Hemipsectra fallax (Butler, 1879)
 スジモンアツバ  — Microxyla confusa (Wileman, 1911)
 マエフタモンアツバ  — Prolophota trigonifera Hampson, 1896
 コウスクモチビアツバ  — Micreremites azumai Sugi, 1982
 ウスクモチビアツバ  — Micreremites japonica Sugi, 1982
 ニセウスクモチビアツバ  — Micreremites pallens Sugi, 1987
 ウラモンチビアツバ  — Micreremites pyraloides Sugi, 1982
 ミスジチャイロアツバ  — Dunira diplogramma (Hampson, 1912)
 チャバネクチバ  — Condate orsilla (Swinhoe, 1897)
 スソミダレアツバ  — Pilipectus prunifera (Hampson, 1894)
 クロクモアツバ  — Acantholipes trajectus (Walker, 1865)
 アマミカバアツバ  — Anachrostis amamiana Sugi, 1982
 ホソバカバアツバ  — Anachrostis minutissima Sugi, 1982
 クロテンカバアツバ  — Anachrostis nigripunctalis (Wileman, 1911)
 フタテンチビアツバ  — Neachrostia bipuncta Sugi, 1982
 キイロチビアツバ  — Neachrostia purpureoflava Sugi, 1982
 ウスオビチビアツバ  — Mimachrostia fasciata Sugi, 1982
 キテンチビアツバ  — Mimachrostia owadai Sugi, 1982
 シロズアツバ  — Ectogonia butleri (Leech, 1900)
 ヒロバチビトガリアツバ  — Hypenomorpha calamina (Butler, 1879)
 チビトガリアツバ  — Hypenomorpha falcipennis (Inoue, 1958)
 アヤナミアツバ  — Zekelita plusioides (Butler, 1879)
 フタキボシアツバ  — Gynaephila maculifera Staudinger, 1892
 ミナミフタキボシアツバ  — Gynaephila punctirena Sugi, 1982
 エダヒゲキボシアツバ  — Naarda pectinata Sugi, 1982
 チビクロアツバ  — Chibidokuga hypenodes Inoue, 1979
 ユミガタマダラウワバ  — Abrostola abrostolina (Butler, 1879)
 和名未定  — Abrostola korbi Dufay, 1958
 オオマダラウワバ  — Abrostola major Dufay, 1957
 ミヤママダラウワバ  — Abrostola pacifica Dufay, 1960
 ウスグロマダラウワバ  — Abrostola sugii Dufay, 1960
 イラクサマダラウワバ  — Abrostola triplasia (Linnaeus, 1758)
 エゾマダラウワバ  — Abrostola ussuriensis Dufay, 1958
 エゾキンウワバ  — Euchalcia sergia (Oberthür, 1884)
 アカキンウワバ  — Polychrysia aurata (Staudinger, 1888)
 マダラキンウワバ  — Polychrysia splendida (Butler, 1878)
 シーモンキンウワバ  — Lamprotes mikadina (Butler, 1878)
 ムラサキウワバ  — Plusidia cheiranthi (Tauscher, 1809)
 キクギンウワバ  — Macdunnoughia confusa (Stephens, 1850)
 オオキクギンウワバ  — Macdunnoughia crassisigna (Warren, 1913)
 和名未定  — Macdunnoughia hybrida Ronkay, 1986
 ギンモンシロウワバ  — Macdunnoughia purissima (Butler, 1878)
 ワイギンモンウワバ  — Sclerogenia jessica (Butler, 1878)
 ギンボシキンウワバ  — Antoculeora locuples (Oberthür, 1880)
 セアカキンウワバ  — Erythroplusia pyropia (Butler, 1879)
 ギンスジキンウワバ  — Erythroplusia rutilifrons (Walker, 1858)
 キシタギンウワバ  — Syngrapha ain (Hochenwarth, 1785)
 ホクトギンウワバ  — Syngrapha interrogationis (Linnaeus, 1758)
 アルプスギンウワバ  — Syngrapha ottolenguii (Dyar, 1903)
 オオムラサキキンウワバ  — Autographa amurica (Staudinger, 1892)
 ムラサキキンウワバ  — Autographa buraetica (Staudinger, 1892)
 タンポキンウワバ  — Autographa excelsa (Kretschmar, 1862)
 ガマキンウワバ  — Autographa gamma (Linnaeus, 1758)
 ケイギンモンウワバ  — Autographa mandarina (Freyer, 1846)
 タマナギンウワバ  — Autographa nigrisigna (Walker, 1858)
 エゾムラサキキンウワバ  — Autographa urupina (Bryk, 1942)
 イネキンウワバ  — Plusia festucae (Linnaeus, 1758)
 和名未定  — Plusia putnami festata Graeser, 1889
 ニセマガリキンウワバ  — Diachrysia bieti (Oberthür, 1884)
 エゾヒサゴキンウワバ  — Diachrysia chrysitis (Linnaeus, 1758)
 オオキンウワバ  — Diachrysia chryson (Esper, 1789)
 リョクモンオオキンウワバ  — Diachrysia coreae (Bryk, 1949)
 マガリキンウワバ  — Diachrysia leonina (Oberthür, 1884)
 コヒサゴキンウワバ  — Diachrysia nadeja (Oberthür, 1880)
 オオヒサゴキンウワバ  — Diachrysia stenochrysis (Warren, 1913)
 シロスジキンウワバ  — Diachrysia zosimi (Hübner, [1822])
 アミメギンウワバ  — Trichoplusia daubei (Boisduval, 1840)
 ハスモンキンウワバ  — Trichoplusia lectula (Walker, 1858)
 イラクサギンウワバ  — Trichoplusia ni (Hübner, [1803])
 キクキンウワバ  — Thysanoplusia intermixta (Warren, 1913)
 ネッタイキクキンウワバ  — Thysanoplusia orichalcea (Fabricius, 1775)
 クロガネキンウワバ  — Scriptoplusia nigriluna (Walker, [1858])
 コセアカキンウワバ  — Zonoplusia ochreata (Walker, 1865)
 ミツモンキンウワバ  — Ctenoplusia agnata (Staudinger, 1892)
 エゾギクキンウワバ  — Ctenoplusia albostriata (Bremer & Grey, 1853)
 ニシキキンウワバ  — Ctenoplusia ichinosei (Dufay, 1965)
 ドウガネキンウワバ  — Ctenoplusia placida (Moore, 1884)
 ホソバネキンウワバ  — Chrysodeixis acuta (Walker, 1853)
 イチジクキンウワバ  — Chrysodeixis eriosoma (Doubleday, 1843)
 イブシギンウワバ  — Chrysodeixis heberachis (Strand, 1920)
 ヒメクロキンウワバ  — Chrysodeixis minutus Dufay, 1970
 ヒゴキンウワバ  — Chrysodeixis taiwani Dufay, 1974
 モモイロキンウワバ  — Anadevidia hebetata (Butler, 1889)
 ウリキンウワバ  — Anadevidia peponis (Fabricius, 1775)
 ハナダカキンウワバ  — Plusiopalpa adrasta (Felder & Rogenhofer, 1874)
 コモンキンウワバ  — Dactyloplusia impulsa (Walker, 1865)
 サザナミキンウワバ  — Dactyloplusia mutans (Walker, 1865)
 シラホシコヤガ  — Enispa bimaculata (Staudinger, 1892)
 キスジコヤガ  — Enispa lutefascialis (Leech, 1889)
 サザナミコヤガ  — Enispa masuii Sugi, 1982
 ミジンベニコヤガ  — Ectoblemma rosella Sugi, 1982
 ソトオビヒメコヤガ  — Acidaliodes perstriata (Hampson, 1907)
 ミナミハイイロコヤガ  — Mataeomera biangulata (Wileman, 1915)
 ハイイロコヤガ  — Mataeomera obliquisigna (Hampson, 1894)
 クロハナコヤガ  — Aventiola pusilla (Butler, 1879)
 イガコヤガ  — Manoblemma cryptica Yoshimoto, 1999
 カバイロシマコヤガ  — Corgatha argillacea (Butler, 1879)
 モモイロシマコヤガ  — Corgatha costimacula (Staudinger, 1892)
 シロスジシマコヤガ  — Corgatha dictaria (Walker, 1861)
 ハイイロシマコヤガ  — Corgatha fusca Tanaka, 1973
 ヨツテンシマコヤガ  — Corgatha fusciceps Sugi, 1982
 フタスジシマコヤガ  — Corgatha marumoi Sugi, 1982
 シマフコヤガ  — Corgatha nitens (Butler, 1879)
 ツマベニシマコヤガ  — Corgatha obsoleta Marumo, 1932
 ベニシマコヤガ  — Corgatha pygmaea Wileman, 1911
 マエグロシマコヤガ  — Corgatha semiobsoleta Yoshimoto, 1999
 ヒメシロスジシマコヤガ  — Corgatha zonalis Walker, [1859]
 ハスオビトガリコヤガ  — Parasada carnosa (Hampson, 1893)
 ウスベニエグリコヤガ  — Holocryptis erubescens (Hampson, 1893)
 ベニエグリコヤガ  — Holocryptis nymphula (Rebel, 1909)
 シロエグリコヤガ  — Holocryptis ussuriensis (Rebel, 1901)
 アヤホソコヤガ  — Araeopteron amoenum Inoue, 1958
 シロホソコヤガ  — Araeopteron flaccidum Inoue, 1958
 マダラホソコヤガ  — Araeopteron fragmentum Inoue, 1965
 クロモンホソコヤガ  — Araeopteron kurokoi Inoue, 1958
 ウスグロホソコヤガ  — Araeopteron nebulosum Inoue, 1965
 ウラモンエグリコヤガ  — Decticryptis deleta (Moore, 1885)
 ベニミスジコヤガ  — Autoba trilinea (de Joannis, 1909)
 ツマトビコヤガ  — Autoba tristalis (Leech, 1889)
 ベニチラシコヤガ  — Eublemma amasina (Eversmann, 1842)
 ソトベニコヤガ  — Eublemma anachoresis (Wallengren, 1863)
 ヨスジコヤガ  — Eublemma baccalix (Swinhoe, 1886)
 シラホシベニコヤガ  — Eublemma cochylioides (Guenée, 1852)
 ベニスジコヤガ  — Eublemma dimidialis (Fabricius, 1794)
 ハイマダラコヤガ  — Eublemma miasma (Hampson, 1891)
 セブトコヤガ  — Eublemma quadrapex (Hampson, 1891)
 ナカオビシロコヤガ  — Eublemma rivula (Moore, 1882)
 ツマテンコヤガ  — Honeyania ragusana (Freyer, 1844)
 テンモンシマコヤガ  — Sophta ruficeps (Walker, 1864)
 ウスベニコヤガ  — Sophta subrosea (Butler, 1881)
 ヤマトコヤガ  — Arasada ornata (Wileman, 1911)
 チャイロコヤガ  — Carmara subcervina Walker, 1863
 ウスキツマキリコヤガ  — Lophoruza lunifera (Moore, 1885)
 モモイロツマキリコヤガ  — Lophoruza pulcherrima (Butler, 1879)
 ウスキコヤガ  — Oruza brunnea (Leech, 1900)
 ヒメクルマコヤガ  — Oruza divisa (Walker, 1862)
 モンシロクルマコヤガ  — Oruza glaucotorna Hampson, 1910
 アトキスジクルマコヤガ  — Oruza mira (Butler, 1879)
 リュウキュウクルマコヤガ  — Oruza obliquaria Marumo, 1932
 マダラクルマコヤガ  — Oruza stragulata (Pagenstecher, 1900)
 アトテンクルマコヤガ  — Oruza submira Sugi, 1982
 ヨシノクルマコヤガ  — Oruza yoshinoensis (Wileman, 1911)
 シロオビクルマコヤガ  — Trisateles emortualis ([Denis & Schiffermüller], 1775)
 マエウストガリコヤガ  — Hyposada hirashimai Sugi, 1982
 ソトキボシコヤガ  — Niaccaba sumptualis Walker, 1866
 ヒメゴマフコヤガ  — Metaemene atrigutta maculata (Leech, [1889])
 アトジロコヤガ  — Metaemene hampsoni Wileman, 1914
 ヒメオビコヤガ  — Maliattha arefacta (Butler, 1879)
 ソトムラサキコヤガ  — Maliattha bella (Staudinger, 1888)
 ネジロコヤガ  — Maliattha chalcogramma (Bryk, 1949)
 ナカウスキコヤガ  — Maliattha khasanica Zolotarenko & Dubatolov, 1995
 ベニモンコヤガ  — Maliattha rosacea (Leech, [1889])
 ハスオビコヤガ  — Maliattha separata Walker, 1863
 ヒメネジロコヤガ  — Maliattha signifera (Walker, 1858)
 フタスジコヤガ  — Deltote bankiana amurula (Staudinger, 1892)
 マダラコヤガ  — Deltote nemorum (Oberthür, 1880)
 スジコヤガ  — Deltote uncula (Clerck, 1759)
 シロヒシモンコヤガ  — Micardia argentata Butler, 1878
 フタホシコヤガ  — Micardia pulchra Butler, 1878
 シロマダラコヤガ  — Protodeltote distinguenda (Staudinger, 1888)
 ニセシロマダラコヤガ  — Protodeltote inexpectata Ueda, 1987
 シロフコヤガ  — Protodeltote pygarga (Hufnagel, 1766)
 マガリスジコヤガ  — Protodeltote wiscotti (Staudinger, 1888)
 トビモンコヤガ  — Pseudodeltote brunnea (Leech, [1889])
 スジシロコヤガ  — Koyaga falsa (Butler, 1885)
 キモンコヤガ  — Koyaga numisma (Staudinger, 1888)
 クロモンコヤガ  — Koyaga senex (Butler, 1881)
 ミドリシロモンコヤガ  — Koyaga virescens (Sugi, 1958)
 キバネシロフコヤガ  — Sugia elaeostygia (Sugi, 1982)
 ニセシロフコヤガ  — Sugia erastroides (Draudt, 1950)
 ネモンシロフコヤガ  — Sugia idiostygia (Sugi, 1958)
 ウスシロフコヤガ  — Sugia stygia (Butler, 1878)
 シロモンコヤガ  — Erastroides fentoni (Butler, 1881)
 和名未定  — Lithacodia squalida (Leech, [1889])
 ミスズコヤガ  — Paraphyllophila confusa Kononenko, 1985
 ビロードコヤガ  — Anterastria atrata (Butler, 1881)
 アオスジコヤガ  — Inabaia culta (Butler, 1879)
 ウチジロコヤガ  — Neustrotia albicincta (Hampson, 1898)
 ウスチャマエモンコヤガ  — Neustrotia costimacula (Oberthür, 1880)
 マエモンコヤガ  — Neustrotia japonica (Warren, 1912)
 エゾコヤガ  — Neustrotia noloides (Butler, 1879)
 ナカキマエモンコヤガ  — Neustrotia sugii (Tanaka, 1973)
 ミイロコヤガ  — Shiraia tripartita (Leech, 1900)
 ナカクロモンコヤガ  — Pseudeustrotia bipartita (Wileman, 1914)
 タデコヤガ  — Pseudeustrotia candidula ([Denis & Schiffermüller], 1775)
 シラクモコヤガ  — Hapalotis venustula (Hübner, 1790)
 ウスアオモンコヤガ  — Bryophilina mollicula (Graeser, 1889)
 オキナワウスイロコヤガ  — Azumaia micardiopsis Sugi, 1982
 モンキコヤガ  — Hyperstrotia flavipuncta (Leech, [1889])
 シロフタオビコヤガ  — Eulocastra excisa (Swinhoe, 1885)
 シラユキコヤガ  — Eulocastra sasakii Sugi, 1985
 モトグロコヤガ  — Xanthograpta basinigra Sugi, 1982
 ヨモギコヤガ  — Phyllophila obliterata cretacea Butler, 1879
 ウスベニホシコヤガ  — Ozarba brunnea (Leech, 1900)
 ホシコヤガ  — Ozarba punctigera Walker, 1865
 ヤジリモンコヤガ  — Ozana chinensis (Leech, 1900)
 フタオビコヤガ  — Naranga aenescens Moore, 1881
 フタイロコヤガ  — Acontia bicolora Leech, 1889
 ウスキマダラコヤガ  — Acontia marmoralis (Fabricius, 1794)
 セマルモンコヤガ  — Acontia olivacea (Hampson, 1891)
 キマダラコヤガ  — Emmelia trabealis (Scopoli, 1763)
 ノシメコヤガ  — Sinocharis korbae Püngeler, 1912
 ヒメシロテンコヤガ  — Amyna axis Guenée, 1852
 マドバネサビイロコヤガ  — Amyna natalis (Walker, 1859)
 クロコサビイロコヤガ  — Amyna punctum (Fabricius, 1794)
 サビイロコヤガ  — Amyna stellata Butler, 1878
 トビイロトラガ  — Sarbanissa subflava (Moore, 1877)
 ベニモントラガ  — Sarbanissa venusta (Leech, [1889])
 ツリフネソウトラガ  — Sarbanissa yunnana (Mell, 1936)
 マイコトラガ本土亜種  — Maikona jezoensis jezoensis Matsumura, 1928
 マイコトラガ屋久島亜種  — Maikona jezoensis tenebricosa Inoue, 1982
 ヒメトラガ  — Asteropetes noctuina (Butler, 1878)
 コトラガ  — Mimeusemia persimilis Butler, 1875
 トラガ  — Chelonomorpha japana japana Motschulsky, 1861
 アオモンギンセダカモクメ  — Cucullia argentea (Hufnagel, 1766)
 トカチセダカモクメ  — Cucullia artemisiae perspicua Warnecke, 1919
 タカネキクセダカモクメ  — Cucullia elongata Butler, 1880
 ホソバセダカモクメ  — Cucullia fraterna Butler, 1878
 ホシヒメセダカモクメ  — Cucullia fraudatrix Eversmann, 1837
 ギンモンセダカモクメ  — Cucullia jankowskii Oberthür, 1884
 キクセダカモクメ  — Cucullia kurilullia kurilullia Bryk, 1942
 ミヤマセダカモクメ  — Cucullia lucifuga ([Denis & Schiffermüller], 1775)
 ハイイロセダカモクメ  — Cucullia maculosa Staudinger, 1888
 ダイセンセダカモクメ  — Cucullia mandschuriae Oberthür, 1884
 セダカモクメ  — Cucullia perforata Bremer, 1861
 ハマセダカモクメ  — Cucullia scopariae Dorfmeister, 1853
 クビジロツメヨトウ  — Oncocnemis campicola Lederer, 1853
 シレトコツメヨトウ  — Oncocnemis senica (Eversmann, 1856)
 クロダケタカネヨトウ  — Sympistis funebris kurodakeana Matsumura, 1927
 タカネヨトウ  — Sympistis heliophila (Paykull, 1793)
 タカセモクメキリガ  — Brachionycha albicilia Sugi, 1970
 エゾモクメキリガ  — Brachionycha nubeculosa jezoensis Matsumura, 1928
 タニガワモクメキリガ  — Brachionycha permixta Sugi, 1970
 ミヤマゴマキリガ上信以外山地亜種  — Feralia sauberi montana (Sugi, 1968)
 ミヤマゴマキリガ上信山地亜種  — Feralia sauberi pernigra Sugi, 1982
 ケンモンミドリキリガ  — Daseochaeta viridis (Leech, [1889])
 オオウスヅマカラスヨトウ  — Amphipyra erebina Butler, 1878
 ナンカイカラスヨトウ  — Amphipyra horiei Owada, 1996
 カラスヨトウ  — Amphipyra livida corvina Motschulsky, 1866
 オオシマカラスヨトウ  — Amphipyra monolitha surnia Felder & Rogenhofer, 1874
 クロシマカラスヨトウ  — Amphipyra okinawensis Sugi, 1982
 ムラマツカラスヨトウ  — Amphipyra perflua (Fabricius, 1787)
 シマカラスヨトウ  — Amphipyra pyramidea yama Swinhoe, 1918
 ツマジロカラスヨトウ  — Amphipyra schrenckii Ménétriès, 1859
 ユワンカラスヨトウ  — Amphipyra sublivida Owada, 1988
 ヤヒコカラスヨトウ  — Amphipyra subrigua Bremer & Grey, 1853
 シロスジカラスヨトウ  — Amphipyra tripartita Butler, 1878
 ミツモンケンモン  — Cymatophoropsis trimaculata (Bremer, 1861)
 ホソバミツモンケンモン  — Cymatophoropsis unca (Houlbert, 1921)
 アオケンモン  — Belciades niveola (Motschulsky, 1866)
 キシタアオバケンモン  — Euromoia subpulchra (Alphéraky, 1897)
 ゴマケンモン  — Moma alpium (Osbeck, 1778)
 キクビゴマケンモン  — Moma kolthoffi Bryk, 1948
 ツシマゴマケンモン  — Moma tsushimana Sugi, 1982
 ニッコウアオケンモン  — Nacna malachitis (Oberthür, 1880)
 スギタニアオケンモン  — Nacna sugitanii (Nagano, 1918)
 スギタニゴマケンモン  — Harrisimemna marmorata Hampson, 1908
 ヒメケンモン  — Gerbathodes angusta (Butler, 1879)
 シロフヒメケンモン  — Gerbathodes paupera (Staudinger, 1892)
 オオケンモン  — Acronicta major (Bremer, 1861)
 シロケンモン  — Acronicta vulpina leporella Staudinger, 1888
 サクラケンモン  — Hyboma adaucta (Warren, 1909)
 ジョウザンケンモン  — Hyboma jozana (Matsumura, 1926)
 エゾサクラケンモン  — Hyboma strigosa sachalinensis (Matsumura, 1925)
 オオモリケンモン  — Molybdonycta omorii (Matsumura, 1926)
 シロモンケンモン  — Plataplecta albistigma (Hampson, 1909)
 アサケンモン  — Plataplecta pruinosa (Guenée, 1852)
 シロハラケンモン  — Plataplecta pulverosa (Hampson, 1909)
 ハイイロケンモン  — Plataplecta tegminalis (Sugi, 1979)
 オオホソバケンモン  — Triaena cuspis (Hübner, [1813])
 リンゴケンモン  — Triaena intermedia (Warren, 1909)
 ゴマシオケンモン  — Triaena isocuspis (Sugi, 1968)
 キハダケンモン本州以南亜種  — Triaena leucocuspis leucocuspis (Butler, 1878)
 キハダケンモン北海道亜種  — Triaena leucocuspis sapporensis (Matsumura, 1926)
 ウスムラサキケンモン  — Triaena subpurpurea (Matsumura, 1926)
 ヒメリンゴケンモン  — Triaena sugii Kinoshita, 1990
 ハンノケンモン  — Jocheaera alni (Linnaeus, 1758)
 ウスズミケンモン  — Hylonycta carbonaria (Graeser, 1889)
 キシタケンモン  — Hylonycta catocaloida (Graeser, 1889)
 シロシタケンモン  — Hylonycta hercules (Felder & Rogenhofer, 1874)
 マダラウスズミケンモン  — Hylonycta subornata (Leech, [1889])
 シベチャケンモン  — Subacronicta concerpta (Draudt, 1937)
 クビグロケンモン  — Viminia digna (Butler, 1881)
 ウスジロケンモン  — Viminia lutea leucoptera (Butler, 1881)
 ナシケンモン  — Viminia rumicis (Linnaeus, 1758)
 タテスジケンモン  — Simyra albovenosa (Goeze, 1781)
 ウスハイイロケンモン  — Subleuconycta palshkovi (Filipjev, 1937)
 シマケンモン  — Craniophora fasciata (Moore, 1884)
 タカオケンモン  — Craniophora harmandi (Poujade, 1898)
 クロフケンモン  — Craniophora jankowskii (Oberthür, 1880)
 イボタケンモン  — Craniophora ligustri ([Denis & Schiffermüller], 1775)
 ネジロシマケンモン  — Craniophora oda (Lattin, 1949)
 クシロツマジロケンモン  — Craniophora pacifica Filipjev, 1927
 ニッコウケンモン  — Craniophora praeclara (Graeser, 1890)
 ウスイロケンモン  — Thalatha japonica Sugi, 1982
 シロフクロケンモン  — Narcotica niveosparsa (Matsumura, 1926)
 アミメケンモン  — Lophonycta confusa (Leech, [1889])
 ムラサキアミメケンモン  — Lophonycta nigropurpurata Sugi, 1985
 マルモンキノコヨトウ  — Bryomoia melachlora (Staudinger, 1892)
 イチモジキノコヨトウ  — Bryophila granitalis (Butler, 1881)
 シレトコキノコヨトウ  — Bryophila orthogramma (Boursin, 1954)
 コイチモジキノコヨトウ  — Bryophila parva Sugi, 1980
 エゾキノコヨトウ  — Cryphia bryophasma Boursin, 1951
 ハイイロキノコヨトウ  — Cryphia griseola (Nagano, 1918)
 ミナミキノコヨトウ  — Cryphia maritima Sugi, 1980
 スジキノコヨトウ  — Cryphia mediofusca Sugi, 1959
 ヒメスジキノコヨトウ  — Cryphia minutissima (Draudt, 1950)
 キノコヨトウ  — Cryphia mitsuhashi (Marumo, 1917)
 マダラキノコヨトウ  — Cryphia sugitanii Boursin, 1961
 スズキキノコヨトウ  — Cryphia suzukiella (Matsumura, 1931)
 アオキノコヨトウ  — Stenoloba assimilis assimilis (Warren, 1909)
 ウスアオキノコヨトウ  — Stenoloba clara (Leech, [1889])
 シロスジキノコヨトウ  — Stenoloba jankowskii (Oberthür, 1885)
 ウンモンキノコヨトウ本土亜種  — Stenoloba manleyi manleyi (Leech, [1889])
 ウンモンキノコヨトウ奄美以南亜種  — Stenoloba manleyi ryukyuensis Kononenko & Ronkay, 2000
 ヘリボシキノコヨトウ  — Stenoloba oculata Draudt, 1950
 アオイガ  — Xanthodes albago (Fabricius, 1794)
 ヒトトガリコヤガ  — Xanthodes intersepta Guenée, 1852
 フタトガリコヤガ  — Xanthodes transversa Guenée, 1852
 コマルモンシロガ  — Sphragifera biplaga (Walker, 1858)
 マルモンシロガ  — Sphragifera sigillata (Ménétriès, 1859)
 シロガ  — Chasmina candida (Walker, 1865)
 オガサワラシロガ  — Chasmina takakuwai Kishida, 2006
 ツマモンキリガ  — Imosca coreana (Matsumura, 1926)
 フタクロアツバ  — Brevipecten consanguis Leech, 1900
 チャバネシロホシクロヨトウ  — Condica albigutta (Wileman, 1912)
 マルデオオホシミミヨトウ  — Condica aroana (Bethune-Baker, 1906)
 セブトシロホシクロヨトウ  — Condica dolorosa (Walker, 1865)
 マエテンヨトウ  — Condica fuliginosa (Leech, 1900)
 オオホシミミヨトウ  — Condica illecta (Walker, 1865)
 ヘリグロヒメヨトウ  — Condica illustrata (Staudinger, 1888)
 ウスホシミミヨトウ  — Condica pallescens (Sugi, 1970)
 ヒメホシミミヨトウ  — Condica serva (Walker, 1858)
 シロテンクロヨトウ  — Prospalta cyclica (Hampson, 1908)
 オオタバコガ  — Helicoverpa armigera armigera (Hübner, [1808])
 タバコガ  — Helicoverpa assulta assulta (Guenée, 1852)
 クロタバコガ  — Helicoverpa sugii Yoshimatsu, 2004
 ヨモギガ  — Schinia scutosa ([Denis & Schiffermüller], 1775)
 ギンスジアカヤガ  — Heliothis bivittata (Walker, 1856)
 トガリウスアカヤガ  — Heliothis cruentana (Moore, 1881)
 ツメクサガ  — Heliothis maritima adaucta Butler, 1878
 ニセタバコガ  — Heliocheilus fervens (Butler, 1881)
 ウスオビヤガ  — Pyrrhia bifasciata (Staudinger, 1888)
 キタバコガ  — Pyrrhia umbra (Hufnagel, 1766)
 アカヘリヤガ  — Adisura atkinsoni Moore, 1881
 アミメツマキリヨトウ  — Callopistria aethiops Butler, 1878
 シロスジツマキリヨトウ  — Callopistria albolineola (Graeser, 1889)
 ギンツマキリヨトウ  — Callopistria argyrosticta (Butler, 1881)
 ヒメツマキリヨトウ  — Callopistria duplicans Walker, 1858
 ネボシツマキリヨトウ  — Callopistria guttulalis Hampson, 1896
 キスジツマキリヨトウ  — Callopistria japonibia Inoue & Sugi, 1958
 ムラサキツマキリヨトウ  — Callopistria juventina (Stoll, 1782)
 ナカウスツマキリヨトウ  — Callopistria maillardi maillardi (Guenée, 1862)
 ミナミツマキリヨトウ  — Callopistria nobilior Eda, 2000
 アヤナミツマキリヨトウ  — Callopistria placodoides (Guenée, 1852)
 コガタツマキリヨトウ  — Callopistria pulchrilinea (Walker, 1862)
 マダラツマキリヨトウ  — Callopistria repleta Walker, 1858
 クロキスジツマキリヨトウ  — Callopistria rivularis Walker, 1858
 ツマナミツマキリヨトウ  — Data clava (Leech, 1900)
 シロアミメヨトウ  — Pseuderiopus albiscriptus (Hampson, 1898)
 オオチャイロヨトウ  — Polia bombycina grisea (Butler, 1878)
 オオシモフリヨトウ  — Polia goliath (Oberthür, 1880)
 クロヨトウ  — Polia mortua (Staudinger, 1888)
 オオシラホシヨトウ  — Polia nebulosa (Hufnagel, 1766)
 シラホシヨトウ  — Melanchra persicariae (Linnaeus, 1761)
 マメヨトウ  — Melanchra pisi nyiwonis (Matsumura, 1925)
 アトジロシラホシヨトウ  — Melanchra postalba Sugi, 1982
 ヨトウガ  — Mamestra brassicae (Linnaeus, 1758)
 オイワケクロヨトウ  — Lacanobia aliena amurensis (Staudinger, 1901)
 ムラサキヨトウ  — Lacanobia contigua ([Denis & Schiffermüller], 1775)
 ミヤマヨトウ  — Lacanobia contrastata (Bryk, 1942)
 シロスジヨトウ  — Lacanobia oleracea (Linnaeus, 1758)
 エゾチャイロヨトウ  — Lacanobia splendens (Hübner, [1808])
 タカネハイイロヨトウ  — Papestra biren (Goeze, 1781)
 シロシタヨトウ  — Sarcopolia illoba (Butler, 1878)
 キミャクヨトウ  — Dictyestra dissecta (Walker, 1865)
 オーロラヨトウ  — Lasionycta skraelingia (Herrich-Schäffer, 1852)
 コイズミヨトウ  — Hadula melanopa koizumidakeana (Matsumura, 1927)
 キタダケヨトウ  — Hadula odontites (Boisduval, 1829)
 タイリクウスイロヨトウ  — Hadula trifolii (Hufnagel, 1766)
 ダイセツキシタヨトウ  — Coranarta carbonaria (Christoph, 1893)
 フサクビヨトウ  — Sideridis honeyi honeyi (Yoshimoto, 1989)
 アサギリヨトウ  — Sideridis incommoda (Staudinger, 1888)
 モモイロフサクビヨトウ  — Sideridis mandarina (Leech, 1900)
 フジシロミャクヨトウ  — Sideridis texturata (Alphéraky, 1892)
 ヒメムラサキヨトウ  — Sideridis unica (Leech, [1889])
 コハイイロヨトウ  — Hadena aberrans (Eversmann, 1856)
 シロオビヨトウ  — Hadena compta ([Denis & Schiffermüller], 1775)
 ヒメハイイロヨトウ  — Hadena corrupta (Herz, 1898)
 コグレヨトウ北海道亜種  — Hadena variolata dealbata (Staudinger, 1892)
 コグレヨトウ本州以南亜種  — Hadena variolata kogurei Sugi, 1958
 フタスジヨトウ  — Protomiselia bilinea (Hampson, 1905)
 クロスジキリガ奄美亜種  — Xylopolia bella amamiensis (Kishida & Yoshimoto, 1979)
 クロスジキリガ屋久島以北亜種  — Xylopolia bella bella (Butler, 1881)
 ケンモンキリガ  — Egira saxea (Leech, [1889])
 マツキリガ  — Panolis japonica Draudt, 1935
 アズサキリガ  — Pseudopanolis azusa Sugi, 1968
 タカオキリガ  — Pseudopanolis takao Inaba, 1927
 キンイロキリガ  — Clavipalpula aurariae (Oberthür, 1880)
 シベチャキリガ  — Perigrapha circumducta (Lederer, 1855)
 スギタニキリガ  — Perigrapha hoenei Püngeler, 1914
 ホソバキリガ  — Anorthoa angustipennis (Matsumura, 1926)
 スモモキリガ  — Anorthoa munda ([Denis & Schiffermüller], 1775)
 アオヤマキリガ  — Orthosia aoyamensis (Matsumura, 1926)
 アカバキリガ  — Orthosia carnipennis (Butler, 1878)
 ウスベニキリガ  — Orthosia cedermarki (Bryk, 1949)
 ゴマフキリガ  — Orthosia coniortota (Filipjev, 1927)
 ヨモギキリガ  — Orthosia ella (Butler, 1878)
 カバキリガ  — Orthosia evanida (Butler, 1879)
 クロテンキリガ  — Orthosia fausta Leech, [1889]
 カシワキリガ  — Orthosia gothica jezoensis (Matsumura, 1926)
 イイジマキリガ  — Orthosia ijimai Sugi, 1955
 ミヤマカバキリガ  — Orthosia incerta incognita Sugi, 1955
 シロヘリキリガ  — Orthosia limbata (Butler, 1879)
 クロミミキリガ  — Orthosia lizetta Butler, 1878
 カギモンキリガ  — Orthosia nigromaculata (Höne, 1917)
 チャイロキリガ  — Orthosia odiosa (Butler, 1878)
 ブナキリガ  — Orthosia paromoea (Hampson, 1905)
 ナマリキリガ  — Orthosia satoi Sugi, 1960
 ヒゴキリガ  — Orthosia yoshizakii Sugi & Ohtsuka, 1984
 アトジロキリガ  — Dioszeghyana mirabilis (Sugi, 1955)
 オオノコバヨトウ  — Tiracola aureata Holloway, 1989
 ノコバヨトウ  — Tiracola plagiata (Walker, 1857)
 ミカワキヨトウ  — Mythimna bani (Sugi, 1977)
 クロテンキヨトウ  — Mythimna chosenicola (Bryk, 1949)
 アトジロキヨトウ  — Mythimna compta (Moore, 1881)
 シロテンキヨトウ  — Mythimna conigera ([Denis & Schiffermüller], 1775)
 ウスアカキヨトウ  — Mythimna curvilinea (Hampson, 1891)
 コウラギンキヨトウ  — Mythimna decisissima (Walker, 1865)
 ナガフタオビキヨトウ  — Mythimna divergens Butler, 1878
 ナカスジキヨトウ  — Mythimna flammea (Curtis, 1828)
 マダラキヨトウ  — Mythimna flavostigma (Bremer, 1861)
 オキナワマダラキヨトウ  — Mythimna formosana (Butler, 1880)
 オオフタオビキヨトウ  — Mythimna grandis Butler, 1878
 ウラギンキヨトウ  — Mythimna hamifera (Walker, 1862)
 ヨシノキヨトウ  — Mythimna impura (Hübner, [1808])
 ウスイロキヨトウ  — Mythimna inanis (Oberthür, 1880)
 ツマアカキヨトウ  — Mythimna inornata (Leech, [1889])
 アマミキヨトウ  — Mythimna inouei (Sugi, 1965)
 カバイロキヨトウ  — Mythimna iodochra (Sugi, 1982)
 コガタキヨトウ  — Mythimna irrorata (Moore, 1881)
 クジュウキヨトウ  — Mythimna lineatipes (Moore, 1881)
 クサシロキヨトウ  — Mythimna loreyi (Duponchel, 1827)
 ミヤマフタオビキヨトウ  — Mythimna matsumuriana (Bryk, 1949)
 スジグロキヨトウ  — Mythimna nigrilinea (Leech, [1889])
 ノヒラキヨトウ  — Mythimna obsoleta (Hübner, [1803])
 ヤエヤマナカオビキヨトウ  — Mythimna opada (Calora, 1966)
 タンポキヨトウ  — Mythimna pallens (Linnaeus, 1758)
 マエジロアカフキヨトウ  — Mythimna pallidicosta (Hampson, 1894)
 ブンゴキヨトウ  — Mythimna percussa (Butler, 1880)
 クロシタキヨトウ  — Mythimna placida Butler, 1878
 ニセスジシロキヨトウ  — Mythimna polysticha (Turner, 1902)
 アカスジキヨトウ  — Mythimna postica (Hampson, 1905)
 ウスベニキヨトウ  — Mythimna pudorina subrosea (Matsumura, 1926)
 フタテンキヨトウ  — Mythimna radiata (Bremer, 1861)
 アカバキヨトウ  — Mythimna rufipennis Butler, 1878
 カバフクロテンキヨトウ  — Mythimna salebrosa (Butler, 1878)
 アワヨトウ  — Mythimna separata (Walker, 1865)
 リュウキュウアカスジキヨトウ  — Mythimna simillima (Walker, 1862)
 ツマグロキヨトウ  — Mythimna simplex japonica Yoshimatsu, 1994
 和名未定  — Mythimna snelleni Hreblay, [1997]
 ヒメクサシロキヨトウ  — Mythimna stenographa (Lower, 1900)
 マメチャイロキヨトウ  — Mythimna stolida (Leech, [1889])
 スジシロキヨトウ  — Mythimna striata (Leech, 1900)
 フタオビキヨトウ  — Mythimna turca (Linnaeus, 1761)
 クニガミキヨトウ  — Mythimna uruma Sugi, 1970
 ユーウスイロキヨトウ  — Mythimna yu (Guenée, 1852)
 ヌカビラネジロキリガ  — Brachylomia viminalis (Fabricius, 1777)
 ホソバオビキリガ  — Dryobotodes angusta Sugi, 1980
 ナカオビキリガ  — Dryobotodes intermissa (Butler, 1886)
 プライヤオビキリガ  — Dryobotodes pryeri (Leech, 1900)
 オガサワラヒゲヨトウ  — Dasypolia fani Staudinger, 1892
 ヒロバモクメキリガ  — Xylena changi Horie, 1993
 キバラモクメキリガ  — Xylena formosa (Butler, 1878)
 アヤモクメキリガ  — Xylena fumosa (Butler, 1878)
 ハネナガモクメキリガ  — Xylena nihonica Höne, 1917
 シロスジキリガ  — Lithomoia solidaginis (Hübner, [1803])
 シロクビキリガ  — Lithophane consocia (Borkhausen, 1792)
 クモガタキリガ  — Lithophane lamda (Fabricius, 1787)
 コケイロホソキリガ  — Lithophane nagaii Sugi, 1958
 モンハイイロキリガ  — Lithophane plumbealis (Matsumura, 1926)
 カシワキボシキリガ  — Lithophane pruinosa (Butler, 1878)
 アメイロホソキリガ  — Lithophane remota Hreblay & Ronkay, 1998
 カタハリキリガ  — Lithophane rosinae (Püngeler, 1906)
 ナカグロホソキリガ  — Lithophane socia (Hufnagel, 1766)
 ハンノキリガ  — Lithophane ustulata (Butler, 1878)
 ウスアオキリガ  — Lithophane venusta (Leech, [1889])
 サヌキキリガ  — Elwesia sugii Yoshimoto, 1994
 カバイロミツボシキリガ  — Eupsilia boursini Sugi, 1958
 ウスミミモンキリガ  — Eupsilia contracta (Butler, 1878)
 ヒダカミツボシキリガ  — Eupsilia hidakaensis Sugi, 1987
 ヨスジノコメキリガ  — Eupsilia quadrilinea (Leech, [1889])
 ヨスジキリガ  — Eupsilia strigifera Butler, 1879
 エゾミツボシキリガ  — Eupsilia transversa (Hufnagel, 1766)
 ミツボシキリガ  — Eupsilia tripunctata Butler, 1878
 ムラサキミツボシキリガ  — Eupsilia unipuncta Scriba, 1919
 クロチャマダラキリガ  — Rhynchaglaea fuscipennis Sugi, 1958
 チャマダラキリガ  — Rhynchaglaea scitula (Butler, 1879)
 ヤクシマキリガ  — Mesorhynchaglaea pacifica Sugi, 1980
 キマエキリガ  — Hemiglaea costalis (Butler, 1879)
 エグリキリガ  — Teratoglaea pacifica Sugi, 1958
 スミレモンキリガ  — Sugitania akirai Sugi, 1990
 ヤマノモンキリガ  — Sugitania clara Sugi, 1990
 スギタニモンキリガ  — Sugitania lepida (Butler, 1879)
 フサヒゲオビキリガ  — Agrochola evelina (Butler, 1879)
 イセキリガ  — Agrochola sakabei Sugi, 1980
 ツチイロキリガ  — Agrochola vulpecula (Lederer, 1853)
 ホシオビキリガ  — Conistra albipuncta (Leech, 1889)
 カシワオビキリガ  — Conistra ardescens (Butler, 1879)
 ゴマダラキリガ  — Conistra castaneofasciata (Motschulsky, 1861)
 テンスジキリガ  — Conistra fletcheri Sugi, 1958
 ミヤマオビキリガ  — Conistra grisescens Draudt, 1950
 ナワキリガ  — Conistra nawae Matsumura, 1926
 イチゴキリガ  — Orbona fragariae pallidior Warren, 1910
 モンキキリガ  — Xanthia icteritia (Hufnagel, 1766)
 キイロキリガ  — Xanthia togata (Esper, 1788)
 オオモンキキリガ  — Xanthia tunicata Graeser, 1889
 エゾキイロキリガ  — Tiliacea japonago (Wileman & West, 1929)
 ミスジキリガ  — Jodia sericea (Butler, 1878)
 ウスキトガリキリガ  — Telorta acuminata (Butler, 1878)
 ノコメトガリキリガ  — Telorta divergens (Butler, 1879)
 キトガリキリガ  — Telorta edentata (Leech, [1889])
 アオバハガタヨトウ  — Antivaleria viridimacula (Graeser, 1889)
 ヘーネアオハガタヨトウ  — Nyctycia hoenei (Boursin, 1958)
 ヤマトハガタヨトウ  — Nyctycia stenoptera (Sugi, 1959)
 ヒマラヤハガタヨトウ  — Nyctycia strigidisca owadai (Yoshimoto, 1988)
 ムラサキハガタヨトウ本州以南亜種  — Blepharita amica amica (Treitschke, 1825)
 ムラサキハガタヨトウ北海道亜種  — Blepharita amica ussuriensis Sheljuzhko, 1919
 ミヤマハガタヨトウ  — Mniotype bathensis (Lutzau, 1901)
 オオハガタヨトウ  — Mniotype melanodonta (Hampson, 1906)
 ハイイロハガタヨトウ  — Meganephria cinerea (Butler, 1881)
 ミドリハガタヨトウ  — Meganephria extensa (Butler, 1879)
 ホソバハガタヨトウ  — Meganephria funesta (Leech, [1889])
 クロビロードヨトウ  — Sidemia bremeri (Erschoff, 1867)
 コケイロビロードヨトウ  — Sidemia spilogramma (Rambur, 1871)
 キタノハマヨトウ  — Apamea anceps maritima Sugi, 1994
 アカモクメヨトウ  — Apamea aquila oriens (Warren, 1911)
 ヒメハガタヨトウ  — Apamea commixta (Butler, 1881)
 カドモンヨトウ  — Apamea crenata (Hufnagel, 1766)
 ネスジシラクモヨトウ  — Apamea hampsoni Sugi, 1963
 オオアカヨトウ  — Apamea lateritia (Hufnagel, 1766)
 ユーラシアオホーツクヨトウ  — Apamea monoglypha (Hufnagel, 1766)
 イシカリヨトウ  — Apamea oblonga (Haworth, 1809)
 オンタケクロヨトウ  — Apamea ontakensis Sugi, 1982
 マツバラシラクモヨトウ  — Apamea remissa (Hübner, [1809])
 アルプスクロヨトウ  — Apamea rubrirena pacifica Sugi, 1982
 セスジヨトウ  — Apamea scolopacina subbrunnea (Warren, 1911)
 チャイロカドモンヨトウ  — Apamea sodalis (Butler, 1878)
 シロミミハイイロヨトウ  — Apamea sordens basistriga (Staudinger, 1892)
 スジアカヨトウ  — Apamea striata Haruta, 1958
 エゾヘリグロヨトウ  — Apamea veterina haelsseni (Graeser, 1889)
 イイデクロヨトウ  — Apamea wasedana Sugi, 1982
 ウスクモヨトウ  — Eremobina pabulatricula fraudulenta (Staudinger, 1888)
 コマエアカシロヨトウ  — Leucapamea askoldis (Oberthür, 1880)
 クロコシロヨトウ  — Leucapamea hikosana (Sugi, 1958)
 マエアカシロヨトウ  — Leucapamea kawadai (Sugi, 1955)
 キュウシュウマエアカシロヨトウ  — Leucapamea kyushuensis (Sugi, 1958)
 アオフシラクモヨトウ  — Antapamea conciliata (Butler, 1878)
 オキナワシラクモヨトウ  — Antapamea okinawensis (Sugi, 1968)
 セアカヨトウ  — Oligia fodinae (Oberthür, 1880)
 シロミミチビヨトウ  — Oligia leuconephra Hampson, 1908
 クサビヨトウ  — Oligia ophiogramma (Esper, 1794)
 ウスキモンヨトウ  — Photedes fluxa rufata (Kardakoff, 1928)
 ヨコスジヨトウ  — Mesoligia furuncula ([Denis & Schiffermüller], 1775)
 ハイイロヨトウ  — Parastichtis suspecta (Hübner, [1817])
 ホシミミヨトウ  — Mesapamea concinnata Heinicke, 1959
 ミヤマチャイロヨトウ北海道亜種  — Mesapamea hedeni hedeni (Graeser, [1889])
 ミヤマチャイロヨトウ本州以南亜種  — Mesapamea hedeni takanensis (Marumo, 1932)
 サッポロチャイロヨトウ  — Sapporia repetita (Butler, 1885)
 マダラヨトウ  — Xenapamea pacifica Sugi, 1970
 ヒコサンコアカヨトウ  — Anapamea apameoides (Draudt, 1950)
 カバマダラヨトウ  — Anapamea cuneatoides Poole, 1989
 ヒメキイロヨトウ  — Anapamea incerta (Staudinger, 1892)
 ハジマヨトウ  — Bambusiphila vulgaris (Butler, 1886)
 ナカグロアカガネヨトウ  — Atrachea japonica (Leech, [1889])
 ミヤケジマヨトウ伊豆諸島以外亜種  — Atrachea miyakensis contaminata Sugi, 1982
 ミヤケジマヨトウ伊豆諸島亜種  — Atrachea miyakensis miyakensis Sugi, 1963
 ギシギシヨトウ  — Atrachea nitens (Butler, 1878)
 イチモジヒメヨトウ  — Xylomoia fusei Sugi, 1976
 クシロモクメヨトウ  — Xylomoia graminea (Graeser, 1889)
 コンゴウミドリヨトウ  — Staurophora celsia (Linnaeus, 1758)
 フキヨトウ  — Hydraecia amurensis Staudinger, 1892
 スギキタヨトウ  — Hydraecia mongoliensis Urbahn, 1967
 キタヨトウ  — Hydraecia ultima Holst, 1965
 タカネショウブヨトウ  — Amphipoea asiatica (Burrows, 1912)
 ミヤマショウブヨトウ  — Amphipoea burrowsi (Chapman, 1912)
 キタショウブヨトウ  — Amphipoea fucosa (Freyer, 1830)
 エゾショウブヨトウ  — Amphipoea lucens (Freyer, 1845)
 ショウブヨトウ  — Amphipoea ussuriensis (Petersen, 1914)
 ショウブオオヨトウ  — Celaena leucostigma (Hübner, [1808])
 ヒメトガリヨトウ  — Gortyna basalipunctata Graeser, 1889
 ゴボウトガリヨトウ  — Gortyna fortis (Butler, 1878)
 オオチャバネヨトウ  — Nonagria puengeleri (Schawerda, 1923)
 ガマヨトウ  — Archanara aerata (Butler, 1878)
 ハガタウスキヨトウ  — Archanara resoluta Hampson, 1910
 キスジウスキヨトウ  — Archanara sparganii (Esper, 1790)
 テンスジウスキヨトウ  — Coenobia orientalis Sugi, 1982
 ヌマベウスキヨトウ  — Chilodes pacificus Sugi, 1982
 キュウシュウスジヨトウ  — Doerriesa coenosa Sugi, 1982
 エゾスジヨトウ  — Doerriesa striata (Staudinger, 1900)
 ヨシヨトウ  — Rhizedra lutosa griseata Warren, 1911
 スジグロウスキヨトウ  — Chortodes brevilineus (Fenn, 1864)
 ホソバウスキヨトウ  — Chortodes elymi (Treitschke, 1825)
 クシヒゲウスキヨトウ  — Ctenostola sparganoides (Bang-Haas, 1927)
 テンモントガリヨトウ  — Sedina buettneri moltrechti (Bang-Haas, 1927)
 チビウスキヨトウ  — Sesamia azumai (Sugi, 1970)
 カバイロウスキヨトウ  — Sesamia confusa (Sugi, 1982)
 イネヨトウ  — Sesamia inferens (Walker, 1856)
 テンオビヨトウ  — Sesamia turpis (Butler, 1879)
 クマソオオヨトウ  — Kumasia kumaso (Sugi, 1963)
 エチゴハガタヨトウ伊豆諸島以外亜種  — Asidemia inexpecta inexpecta (Sugi, 1963)
 エチゴハガタヨトウ伊豆諸島亜種  — Asidemia inexpecta insulicola (Sugi, 1963)
 ウスキシタヨトウ  — Triphaenopsis cinerescens Butler, 1885
 エゾキシタヨトウ  — Triphaenopsis jezoensis Sugi, 1962
 シロホシキシタヨトウ  — Triphaenopsis lucilla Butler, 1878
 ナカジロキシタヨトウ  — Triphaenopsis postflava (Leech, 1900)
 ツシマキシタヨトウ  — Olivenebula oberthueri (Staudinger, 1892)
 ウスアオヨトウ  — Polyphaenis subviridis (Butler, 1878)
 コマルバヨトウ  — Hemictenophora euplexiodes euplexiodes Sugi, 1970
 ソトシロフヨトウ  — Colocasidia albifera Sugi, 1982
 トビイロアカガネヨトウ  — Euplexia albilineola (Wileman & South, 1918)
 ムラサキアカガネヨトウ  — Euplexia koreaeplexia Bryk, 1949
 アカガネヨトウ  — Euplexia lucipara (Linnaeus, 1758)
 ホソバミドリヨトウ  — Euplexidia angusta Yoshimoto, 1987
 マエグロシラオビアカガネヨトウ  — Phlogophora albovittata (Moore, 1867)
 モンキアカガネヨトウ  — Phlogophora aureopuncta (Hampson, 1908)
 キグチヨトウ  — Phlogophora beatrix Butler, 1878
 シラオビアカガネヨトウ  — Phlogophora illustrata (Graeser, [1889])
 コゴマヨトウ  — Chandata bella (Butler, 1881)
 シロモンアカガネヨトウ  — Valeria dilutiapicana splendida (Sugi, 1958)
 シロフアオヨトウ  — Xenotrachea niphonica Kishida & Yoshimoto, 1979
 カラフトシロスジヨトウ  — Hyppa rectilinea (Esper, 1788)
 セブトモクメヨトウ  — Auchmis saga (Butler, 1878)
 コモクメヨトウ  — Actinotia intermediata (Bremer, 1861)
 ヒメモクメヨトウ  — Actinotia polyodon (Clerck, 1759)
 スジクロモクメヨトウ  — Dypterygia andreji Kardakoff, 1928
 クロモクメヨトウ  — Dypterygia caliginosa (Walker, 1858)
 モクメヨトウ  — Axylia putris (Linnaeus, 1761)
 ミヨタトラヨトウ  — Oxytrypia orbiculosa ussurica Schawerda, 1923
 シロスジアオヨトウ  — Trachea atriplicis gnoma (Butler, 1878)
 ヒメシロテンアオヨトウ  — Trachea melanospila Kollar, [1844]
 オオシロテンアオヨトウ  — Trachea punkikonis lucilla Sugi, 1982
 ハガタアオヨトウ  — Trachea tokiensis (Butler, 1884)
 ミツボシヨトウ  — Feliniopsis indistans (Guenée, 1852)
 カラカネヨトウ屋久島以北亜種  — Karana hoenei hoenei (Bang-Haas, 1927)
 カラカネヨトウ奄美以南亜種  — Karana hoenei inornata Sugi, 1991
 アオアカガネヨトウ  — Karana laetevirens (Oberthür, 1884)
 ウスクロモクメヨトウ  — Dipterygina cupreotincta Sugi, 1954
 コクロモクメヨトウ  — Dipterygina japonica (Leech, [1889])
 ホソバヨトウ  — Sasunaga longiplaga Warren, 1912
 ヨスジアカヨトウ  — Pygopteryx suava Staudinger, 1887
 キイロトガリヨトウ  — Brachyxanthia zelotypa (Lederer, 1853)
 クシナシスジキリヨトウ  — Spodoptera cilium Guenée, 1852
 スジキリヨトウ  — Spodoptera depravata (Butler, 1879)
 アフリカシロナヨトウ  — Spodoptera exempta (Walker, 1857)
 シロイチモジヨトウ  — Spodoptera exigua (Hübner, [1808])
 ハスモンヨトウ  — Spodoptera litura (Fabricius, 1775)
 シロナヨトウ  — Spodoptera mauritia acronyctoides Guenée, 1852
 クシヒゲスジキリヨトウ  — Spodoptera pecten Guenée, 1852
 アカマダラヨトウ  — Spodoptera picta (Guérin-Méneville, 1838)
 シロテンウスグロヨトウ  — Athetis albisignata (Oberthür, 1879)
 クロテンヨトウ  — Athetis cinerascens (Motschulsky, 1861)
 エゾウスイロヨトウ  — Athetis correpta (Püngeler, 1907)
 ミツボシモンオビヨトウ  — Athetis costiloba Sugi, 1982
 テンウスイロヨトウ  — Athetis dissimilis (Hampson, 1909)
 ウスグロヨトウ  — Athetis funesta (Staudinger, 1888)
 オビウスイロヨトウ  — Athetis furvula lentina (Staudinger, 1888)
 ヒメオビウスイロヨトウ  — Athetis gluteosa (Treitschke, 1835)
 ヒメウスグロヨトウ  — Athetis lapidea Wileman, 1911
 コウスイロヨトウ  — Athetis lepigone (Möschler, 1860)
 シロモンオビヨトウ  — Athetis lineosa (Moore, 1881)
 ヒメシロモンオビヨトウ  — Athetis lineosella Sugi, 1982
 キバネシロテンウスグロヨトウ  — Athetis pallidipennis Sugi, 1982
 リュウキュウウスイロヨトウ  — Athetis placida (Moore, 1884)
 ヒメサビスジヨトウ  — Athetis stellata (Moore, 1882)
 スジウスイロヨトウ  — Athetis striolata (Butler, 1886)
 オスキバネヨトウ  — Athetis thoracica (Moore, 1884)
 フタホシヨトウ  — Hoplodrina euryptera Boursin, 1937
 ウグイスセダカヨトウ  — Mormo cyanea Sugi, 1982
 アオバセダカヨトウ  — Mormo muscivirens Butler, 1878
 ノコメセダカヨトウ  — Orthogonia sera Felder & Felder, 1862
 アマミノコメセダカヨトウ  — Orthogonia sugii Seino, 1992
 ツクシカラスヨトウ  — Callyna contracta Warren, 1913
 アコウツマジロヨトウ  — Callyna monoleuca Walker, 1858
 ハイイロモクメヨトウ  — Antha grata (Butler, 1881)
 ハグルマヨトウ  — Apsarasa radians (Westwood, 1848)
 フタスジキリガ  — Enargia flavata Wileman & West, 1930
 ウスシタキリガ  — Enargia paleacea (Esper, 1788)
 シマキリガ  — Cosmia achatina Butler, 1879
 ニレキリガ  — Cosmia affinis (Linnaeus, 1767)
 シラオビキリガ  — Cosmia camptostigma (Ménétriès, 1859)
 ミカヅキキリガ  — Cosmia cara (Butler, 1881)
 ツマグロキリガ  — Cosmia inconspicua (Draudt, 1950)
 ミチノクキリガ  — Cosmia mali Sugi, 1982
 キシタキリガ  — Cosmia moderata (Staudinger, 1888)
 ナシキリガ  — Cosmia pyralina ([Denis & Schiffermüller], 1775)
 シラホシキリガ  — Cosmia restituta picta (Staudinger, 1888)
 ヒイロキリガ  — Cosmia sanguinea Sugi, 1955
 ヒメミカヅキキリガ  — Cosmia spurcopyga trapezinula (Filipjev, 1927)
 イタヤキリガ  — Cosmia trapezina exigua (Butler, 1881)
 ミヤマキリガ  — Cosmia unicolor (Staudinger, 1892)
 ヤンコウスキーキリガ  — Xanthocosmia jankowskii (Oberthür, 1884)
 マダラキボシキリガ  — Dimorphicosmia variegata (Oberthür, 1879)
 ヤナギキリガ  — Ipimorpha retusa (Linnaeus, 1761)
 ドロキリガ  — Ipimorpha subtusa ([Denis & Schiffermüller], 1775)
 アイノクロハナギンガ  — Chasminodes aino Sugi, 1956
 ハルタギンガ  — Chasminodes albonitens (Bremer, 1861)
 エゾクロギンガ  — Chasminodes atratus (Butler, 1884)
 ニセハルタギンガ  — Chasminodes bremeri Sugi & Kononenko, 1981
 ウススジギンガ  — Chasminodes cilia (Staudinger, 1888)
 ヤマトギンガ  — Chasminodes japonicus Sugi, 1955
 ウラギンガ  — Chasminodes nervosus (Butler, 1881)
 ヒロオビクロギンガ  — Chasminodes nigrilineus (Leech, [1889])
 ムジギンガ  — Chasminodes pseudalbonitens Sugi, 1955
 クロハナギンガ  — Chasminodes sugii Kononenko, 1981
 ヒメギンガ  — Chasminodes unipunctus Sugi, 1955
 ネグロヨトウ  — Chytonix albonotata (Staudinger, 1892)
 ホソバネグロヨトウ  — Chytonix subalbonotata Sugi, 1959
 チャオビヨトウ  — Niphonyx segregata (Butler, 1878)
 ベニモンヨトウ  — Oligonyx vulnerata (Butler, 1878)
 マエホシヨトウ  — Pyrrhidivalva sordida (Butler, 1881)
 ヒトテンヨトウ  — Chalconyx ypsilon (Butler, 1879)
 マダラムラサキヨトウ  — Eucarta amethystina (Hübner, [1803])
 ウスグロシマヨトウ  — Eucarta arcta (Lederer, 1853)
 ヒメシマヨトウ  — Eucarta arctides (Staudinger, 1888)
 シマヨトウ  — Eucarta fasciata (Butler, 1878)
 ウスムラサキヨトウ  — Eucarta virgo (Treitschke, 1835)
 マルシロホシヒメヨトウ  — Dysmilichia fukudai Sugi, 1963
 モンオビヒメヨトウ  — Dysmilichia gemella (Leech, [1889])
 フタテンヒメヨトウ  — Hadjina biguttula (Motschulsky, 1866)
 サビイロヒメヨトウ  — Hadjina chinensis (Wallengren, 1860)
 シロマダラヒメヨトウ  — Iambia japonica Sugi, 1958
 アミメヒメヨトウ  — Iambia transversa (Moore, 1882)
 キクビヒメヨトウ  — Prometopus flavicollis (Leech, [1889])
 ニセトガリヨトウ  — Virgo confusa Kishida & Yoshimoto, 1991
 トガリヨトウ  — Virgo datanidia (Butler, 1885)
 ナナメヒメヨトウ  — Balsa leodura (Staudinger, 1887)
 ギンモンアカヨトウ  — Plusilla rosalia Staudinger, 1892
 ハマオモトヨトウ  — Brithys crini crini (Fabricius, 1775)
 オオクロバヤガ  — Euxoa adumbrata (Eversmann, 1842)
 ムギヤガ  — Euxoa karschi (Graeser, 1889)
 クロヤガ  — Euxoa nigrata Matsumura, 1925
 クモマウスグロヤガ  — Euxoa ochrogaster rossica (Staudinger, 1881)
 ウスグロヤガ  — Euxoa sibirica (Boisduval, 1832)
 ポロシリモンヤガ  — Protexarnis balanistis (Grote, 1873)
 センモンヤガ  — Agrotis exclamationis informis Leech, [1889]
 タマナヤガ  — Agrotis ipsilon (Hufnagel, 1766)
 フルショウヤガ  — Agrotis militaris Staudinger, 1888
 ハマヤガ  — Agrotis ripae albovenosa Tschetverikow, 1925
 ホッキョクモンヤガ  — Agrotis ruta Eversmann, 1851
 マエグロヤガ  — Agrotis scotacra (Filipjev, 1927)
 カブラヤガ  — Agrotis segetum ([Denis & Schiffermüller], 1775)
 ベルイマンヤガ  — Agrotis stenibergmani (Bryk, 1941)
 オオカブラヤガ  — Agrotis tokionis Butler, 1881
 アトウスヤガ  — Actebia fennica (Tauscher, 1806)
 ホソアオバヤガ  — Actebia praecox flavomaculata (Graeser, [1889])
 オオホソアオバヤガ  — Actebia praecurrens (Staudinger, 1888)
 コキマエヤガ  — Albocosta triangularis (Moore, 1867)
 マエジロヤガ  — Ochropleura plecta glaucimacula (Graeser, 1889)
 ナカトビヤガ  — Chersotis cuprea japonica (Warnecke, 1940)
 ヒメカクモンヤガ  — Chersotis deplanata (Eversmann, 1843)
 ホシボシヤガ  — Hermonassa arenosa (Butler, 1881)
 クロクモヤガ  — Hermonassa cecilia Butler, 1878
 シロオビハイイロヤガ  — Spaelotis lucens Butler, 1881
 アカマエヤガ  — Spaelotis nipona (Felder & Rogenhofer, 1874)
 ヒメアカマエヤガ  — Spaelotis ravida ([Denis & Schiffermüller], 1775)
 キタウスグロヤガ  — Spaelotis suecica (Aurivillius, 1890)
 和名未定  — Graphiphora augur (Fabricius, 1781)
 キタミモンヤガ  — Pseudohermonassa melancholica (Lederer, 1853)
 マエウスヤガ  — Eugraphe sigma ([Denis & Schiffermüller], 1775)
 ノコスジモンヤガ  — Coenophila subrosea (Stephens, 1829)
 ウスイロカバスジヤガ  — Sineugraphe bipartita (Graeser, [1889])
 カバスジヤガ  — Sineugraphe exusta (Butler, 1878)
 オオカバスジヤガ  — Sineugraphe oceanica (Kardakoff, 1928)
 ナカオビチャイロヤガ  — Paradiarsia punicea (Hübner, [1803])
 クシヒゲモンヤガ  — Lycophotia cissigma (Ménétriès, 1859)
 エゾクシヒゲモンヤガ  — Lycophotia velata (Staudinger, 1888)
 ニセタマナヤガ  — Peridroma saucia (Hübner, [1808])
 ウスアカヤガ  — Diarsia albipennis (Butler, 1889)
 ミヤマアカヤガ  — Diarsia brunnea ([Denis & Schiffermüller], 1775)
 オオバコヤガ  — Diarsia canescens (Butler, 1878)
 エゾオオバコヤガ  — Diarsia dahlii (Hübner, [1813])
 コウスチャヤガ  — Diarsia deparca (Butler, 1879)
 モンキヤガ  — Diarsia dewitzi (Graeser, 1889)
 ヤマトウスチャヤガ  — Diarsia nipponica Ogata, 1957
 アカフヤガ  — Diarsia pacifica Boursin, 1943
 ウスイロアカフヤガ  — Diarsia ruficauda (Warren, 1909)
 ダイセツヤガ  — Xestia albuncula (Eversmann, 1851)
 シロモンヤガ  — Xestia c-nigrum (Linnaeus, 1758)
 アサマウスモンヤガ  — Xestia descripta (Bremer, 1861)
 ウスチャヤガ  — Xestia dilatata (Butler, 1879)
 タンポヤガ  — Xestia ditrapezium orientalis (Strand, 1916)
 キシタミドリヤガ  — Xestia efflorescens (Butler, 1879)
 クロフトビイロヤガ  — Xestia fuscostigma (Bremer, 1861)
 ハコベヤガ  — Xestia kollari plumbata (Butler, 1881)
 ハイイロキシタヤガ  — Xestia semiherbida decorata (Butler, 1879)
 アトジロアルプスヤガ  — Xestia sincera (Herrich-Schäffer, 1851)
 アルプスヤガ  — Xestia speciosa (Hübner, [1813])
 マエキヤガ  — Xestia stupenda (Butler, 1878)
 キミミヤガ  — Xestia tabida (Butler, 1878)
 ナカグロヤガ  — Xestia undosa (Leech, [1889])
 タカネモンヤガ  — Xestia wockei tundrana (Bang-Haas, 1912)
 ヤツガダケヤガ  — Xestia yatsugadakeana (Matsumura, 1926)
 クロギシギシヤガ  — Naenia contaminata (Walker, 1865)
 オオシラホシヤガ  — Eurois occulta (Linnaeus, 1758)
 アオバヤガ  — Anaplectoides prasinus ([Denis & Schiffermüller], 1775)
 オオアオバヤガ  — Anaplectoides virens (Butler, 1878)
 ムラサキウスモンヤガ  — Cerastis leucographa ([Denis & Schiffermüller], 1775)
 カギモンヤガ  — Cerastis pallescens (Butler, 1878)
 ネムロウスモンヤガ  — Cerastis rubricosa ([Denis & Schiffermüller], 1775)

N